= Julian (given name) =

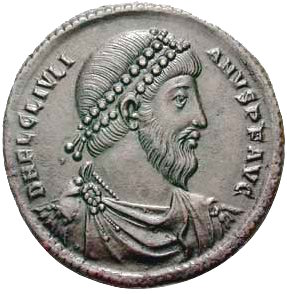
- Julian, emperor of the Roman Empire
- Gender: Male

Origin
- Origin: Latin
- Meaning: "youthful", "shiny", "juvenile"
- Region of origin: Europe

Other names
- Related names: Julius; Julianne; Julio; Julia; Jolyon; Juliano; Julie; Jillian; Julien

Julian is a common male given name in the United States, Germany, Austria, the United Kingdom, Ireland, the Netherlands (as Juliaan), France (as Julien), Italy (as Giuliano), Russia [Iulian (Yulian)] Spain, Latin America (as Julián in Spanish and Juliano or Julião in Portuguese), Iulian in Romanian and elsewhere.

The name is based on the Roman name Julianus, which was derived from Julius. This was the name of the Roman emperor Julian (4th century). It was also borne by several early saints, including the legendary Saint Julian the Hospitaller. This name has been used in England since the Middle Ages, at which time it was also a feminine name (from Juliana, eventually becoming Gillian).

== Variations ==
Some variations of the name are:

- Iúileán
- Julius
- Juliana
- Giuliano
- Jolyon
- Julian
- Julián
- Julijan
- Juliyan
- Julien
- Julyan
- Jullyan
- Juleane
- Julean
- Juliaan
- Julianne
- Julion
- Julyin
- Julyon
- Juliano
- Julen
- Juliene
- Julienn
- Julienne
- Jullien
- Jullin
- Julyen
- Jülyen
- Jullian
- Ιουλιανός (Iulianos, Ioulianos)
- Юлиян
- Juljan
- Illán
- Iulian
- Iulică
- Turiano
- Lulo
- Juli
- Gabelica
- Xhulian
- Xulián
- Xián
- Xiao
- Zhulian
- Rulue

== People ==
Notable people named Julian/Julián include:

=== Antiquity ===
- Marcus Antonius Julianus, a procurator of Judea from 66 to 70 AD during the time of the First Jewish–Roman War
- Tettius Julianus (fl. 70 ADs), commander of a legion under Marcus Aponius Saturninus
- Salvius Julianus (c.110–c.170), Roman jurist, often cited in legal texts as 'Julian' or 'Julianus'
- Didius Julianus (133 or 137–193), Roman emperor (rarely known as Julian I.)
- Gaius Asinius Nicomachus Julianus (born 185), Proconsul of Asia
- Julian of Pannonia (fl. 283–293), Roman usurper
- Julius Julianus (fl. 315–325), grandfather of the emperor Julian, Roman administrator under Constantine the Great
- Amnius Anicius Julianus (fl. 322–329), politician of the Roman Empire
- Julian (emperor) (332–363), Flavius Claudius Julianus, Roman emperor (rarely known as Julian II.)
- Julianus Pomerius, a Christian priest in fifth century Gaul
- Julian of Eclanum, Italian Christian bishop
- Julianus ben Sabar (Julian ben Sabar, fl. 529–531), leader of the Samaritans
- Julian, Count of Ceuta (fl. 710), Visigothic hero/traitor

=== Arts, actors, composers and musician ===
- Julian Adams, American actor
- Julian Edwin Adderley (1928–1975), better known as Cannonball Adderley, American jazz musician
- Julián Alarcón (1888–1957), Paraguayan composer and violinist
- J. Alden Weir (1852–1919), American painter
- Julian Anderson (born 1967), British composer and teacher of composition
- Julian Andretti (born 1970), Chilean pornographic actor and director
- Julian Antonisz (1941–1987), Polish filmmaker, artist, animator, screenwriter, composer and inventor
- Julián Apezteguia (born 1974), Argentine film cinematographer
- Julian Arahanga (born 1972), New Zealand actor
- Julián Arango (born 1968), Colombian actor
- Julián Arcas (1832–1882), Spanish guitarist and composer
- Julian Argüelles (born 1966), English jazz saxophonist
- Julian Armour (born 1960), Canadian cellist and artistic director
- Julian Ashton (1851–1942), Australian artist
- Julian Austin (born 1963), Canadian musician
- Julian Bahula (1938–2023), South African drummer, composer and bandleader
- Julian Bailey (born 1977), Canadian actor
- Julian Barnes (born 1946), English novelist
- Julian Barratt (born 1968), English actor, comedian, and musician
- Julian Barry (1930–2023), American screenwriter and playwright
- Julián Bautista (1901–1961), Spanish composer and conductor
- Julian Beck (1925–1985), American actor, stage director, poet and painter
- Julian Beeston, English electronic musician
- Julian Beever, British sidewalk chalk artist
- Julian Benson (1971–2025), Australian-born Irish choreographer
- Julian Berntzen (born 1981), Norwegian musical artist
- Julian Biggs (1920–1972), Canadian director and producer
- Julian Blaustein (1913–1995), American film producer
- Julian Bleach (born 1963), English actor
- Julian Bliss, British musical artist
- Julián Bonequi (born 1974), Mexican musician
- Julián Bourges (1910–1976), Argentine actor
- Julian Bovis, British artist and award-winning art director
- Julian Bream (1933–2020), English classical musician
- Julian Brown, British artist
- Julian Butler (born 1970), English musical artist
- Julian Byzantine (born 1945), British classical guitarist
- Julián Carrillo (1875–1965), Mexican musician
- Julian Casablancas (born 1978), American rock musician
- Julian Chagrin (born 1940), British-Israeli comedy actor
- Julian Charrière, French-Swiss conceptual artist
- Julian Cheung (born 1971), Hong Kong actor and singer
- Julian Christopher (1944–2023), American actor
- Julian Cihi, Japanese-American actor
- Julian Clarke (born 1977), Canadian film editor
- Julian Clarkson, English baritone
- Julian Clary (born 1959), English comedian
- Julian Clifford (1877–1921), English conductor, composer and pianist
- Julian Cochran (born 1974), English classical composer
- Julian Colbeck, British musician
- Julian Cope (born 1957), English rock musician
- Julian Coryell, American musician
- Julian Cubillos (born 1991), American musical artist
- Julian Curry (1937–2020), English actor
- Julian Daan (1945–2019), Cebuano actor, comedian and politician
- Sean Julian Danielsen (born 1982), guitarist and lead vocalist for American rock bands Smile Empty Soul and World Fire Brigade
- Julian Dash (1916–1974), American jazz musician
- Julian David (born 1989), German singer, actor and entertainer
- Julian Dawson (born 1954) British singer–songwriter, guitarist and author
- Julian Oliver Davidson (1853–1894), American marine painter
- Julian Dawes, English composer
- Julian Day, visual artist, composer and broadcaster
- Julian De La Chica, musical artist
- Julian De Zotti, Canadian actor, writer, director and producer
- Julian Deda (born 1980), Albanian comedian and actor
- Julian Dennison (born 2002), New Zealand actor
- Julian Dorio (born 1981), American drummer
- Julian Doyle, British filmmaker
- Julian Dutton, British comedian
- Julian Edwards (1855–1910), English composer
- Julian Egerton (1848–1945), English musician
- Julián Elfenbein (born 1972), Chilean musical artist
- Julian Eltinge (1881–1941), actor and female impersonator
- Julian Emery, British musical artist
- Julian Estrada (born 1996), Filipino teen actor
- Julian Euell (1929–2019), American jazz bassist
- Julian Fałat (1853–1929), Polish painter
- Julian Fane, Canadian musician
- Julián Farietta (born 1988), Colombian actor and model
- Julian Farino (born 1965), English film and TV producer and director
- Julian Fauth, Canadian musical artist
- Julián Felipe (1861–1944), Filipino composer
- Julian Fellowes (born 1949), English actor, novelist, film director, screenwriter and Conservative Party life peer
- Julian Fenton (born 1964), English musical artist
- Julian Firth (born 1961), English actor
- Julian Fontana (1810–1869), Polish musician
- Julian Fulton, American singer-songwriter
- Julian Gallagher (born 1968), British songwriter and record producer
- Julian Gargiulo (born 1972), Italian-American classical pianist
- Julian Gaskell, British musician
- Julian Gavin (born 1965), Australian-born British operatic tenor
- Julián Gayarre (1844–1890), Spanish opera singer
- Julián Gil (born 1970), Argentine-born Puerto Rican film, TV and stage actor
- Julian Gilbey (born 1975), British film director, screenwriter, film editor, cinematographer and actor
- Julian Glover (born 1935), English actor
- Julian Goldberger, American film director
- Julian Gough (born 1966), English-born Irish musician
- Julian P. Graham, American artist
- Julian Grant (born 1960), British composer
- Julian Grey (born 2006), American actor
- Julian Hamilton (born 1976), Australian musician
- Julian Hanshaw (born 1971), British cartoonist
- Julian Harries, British actor and playwright
- Julian Hoke Harris (1906–1987), American artist
- Julian Hatton (born 1956), American artist
- Julian Hector, BBC television producer
- Julian Hee (born 1978), Singaporean actor
- Julian Henriques (born 1951), British filmmaker and academic
- Julián Hernández (born 1972), Mexican multi-awarded filmmaker
- Julián de la Herrería (1888–1937), Paraguayan painter, engraver and ceramicist
- Julian Hilliard (born 2011), American actor
- Julian Miles Holland (born 1958), better known as Jools Holland, musician
- Julian Holloway (1944–2025), British actor
- Julian Hosking (1953–1989), British ballet dancer
- Julian Howarth, British sound mixer and recordist
- Julián Infante (1957–2000), Spanish guitarist and composer
- Julian Jarrold (born 1960), English film and TV director
- Julian Jordan (born 1995), Dutch DJ and music producer
- Julian Jordan (1850–1929), American musician and vocal instructor
- Julian Joseph (born 1966), British jazz musician, bandleader and broadcaster
- Julian Kay (born 1974), British actor
- Julian Kemp, director of TV and film
- Julian Jootaek Kim (born 1986), South Korean baritone opera singer, musical actor and crossover artist
- Julian King, American recording engineer
- Julian Knowles (composer) (born 1965), Australian musical artist
- Julian Konstantinov (born 1966), Bulgarian operatic bass
- Julian Koster (born 1972), American musician
- Julian Kostov (born 1989), Bulgarian actor, filmmaker, and athlete
- Julian Krainin (born 1941), American film producer
- Julian Kuerti (born 1976), Canadian conductor
- Julian Külpmann (born 1989), German drummer
- Julian Kytasty (born 1958), American kobzar, bandurist and flautist
- Julian Lage (born 1987), American guitarist and composer
- Julián Legaspi (born 1973), Uruguayan-Peruvian actor
- Julian Lennon (born 1963), English musician
- Julian Le Play (born 1991), Austrian musical artist
- Julian E. Levi (1900–1982), American painter
- Julian Lewis Jones (born 1968), Welsh actor
- Julian Lloyd Webber (born 1951), English cellist
- Julián López (born 1978), Spanish comedian and actor
- Julian MacKay, American ballet dancer
- Julián Marin (born 1990), Spanish musical artist
- Julian Marley (born 1975), English/Jamaican musician
- Julian Maroun (born 1993), Australian actor
- Julian Martinez (1879–1943), American painter
- Julián Mateos (1938–1996), Spanish actor
- Julian May (1931–2017), American fiction writer (female)
- Julian Mayfield (1928–1984), American dramatist and activist
- Julian McCullough (born 1979), American actor, writer and comedian
- Julian McMahon (1968–2025), Australian actor and model
- Julian Mendelsohn, Australian musical artist
- Julian Mitchell (born 1935), English screenwriter, novelist
- Julian Morris (born 1983), English actor
- Julian Morrow, Australian comedian
- Julian Nott (born 1960), British composer
- Julian Onderdonk (1882–1922), American painter
- Julian Opie (born 1958), English artist
- Julián Orbón (1925–1991), Spanish composer
- Julian Orchard (1930–1979), English comedy actor
- Julian Ovenden (born 1975), British actor
- Julian Pałka (1923–2002), Polish poster artist
- Julian Patrick (1927–2009), American opera singer
- Julian Pellicano (born 1980), American music conductor
- Julian Perkins, British early music conductor and keyboard player
- Julian Perretta (born 1989), English musical artist
- Julian Perry (born 1960), English painter
- Julian Phelps Allan (1892–1996), English sculptor
- Julian Philips (born 1969), British composer
- Julian T. Pinder, Canadian filmmaker
- Julian Piotrowiak (born 1970), Polish musical artist
- Julian Piper (1947–2019), British musician
- Julian Podger, English tenor
- Julian Prégardien (born 1984), German tenor
- Julian Priester (born 1935), American jazz trombonist
- Julian Quintart (born 1987), Belgian-born South Korea-based TV personality
- Julian Rachlin (born 1974), Lithuanian Jewish / Austrian classical musician
- Julian Raymond, American songwriter and music producer
- Julián Rebolledo, American actor
- Julian Rhind-Tutt (born 1967), English actor
- Julian Richards (born 1968), Welsh film director
- Julian Richings (born 1956), English Canadian actor
- Julian Ritter (1909–2000), American painter
- Julian Rivero (1890–1976), American actor
- Julian Rix (1850–1903), American landscape artist
- Julián Robledo (1887–1940), Argentine composer
- Julian Rogers (born 1947), Caribbean broadcaster and journalist
- Julián Román (born 1977), Colombian actor
- Julián Romea (1813–1868), Spanish theater actor and writer
- Julian Rosefeldt (born 1965), German artist and filmmaker
- Julian Royce (1870–1946), British actor
- Julian Rushton (born 1941), English musicologist
- Julian Samuel (born 1952), Canadian documentary filmmaker, writer and painter
- Julian Sands (1958–2023), English actor
- Julian Sas (born 1970), musical artist
- Julian Jay Savarin (born 1950), British musician and writer
- Julian Scanlan (born 1997), electronic music producer and DJ known as Slushii
- Julian Schiller, Australian TV and radio personality
- Julian Schlossberg (born 1942), American film producer
- Julian Schnabel (born 1951), American artist and filmmaker
- Julian Schwarz (born 1991), American cellist of Austrian descent
- Julian Scriabin (1908–1919), Russian composer
- Julián Serrano (born 1993), Argentine YouTuber, actor, singer and TV presenter
- Julian Siegel, British musical artist
- Julian Simon (1932–1998), American professor and author
- Julian Sitkovetsky (1925–1958), Soviet violinist
- Julian Slade (1930–2006), English composer
- Julián Soler (1907–1977), Mexican actor and film director
- Julian Somers (1903–1976), English actor
- Julian Stair, British potter
- Julian Stanczak (1928–2017), Polish-born American painter
- Julian Steckel (born 1982), German cellist and academic teacher
- Julian Stone (born 1962), British actor, writer and producer
- Julian Russell Story (1857–1919), American painter
- Julian Strøm (1901–1992), Norwegian actor
- Julian Taylor, Canadian singer-songwriter
- Julian Trevelyan (1910–1988), English artist and poet
- Julian Trevelyan (born 1998), British pianist
- Julian Trono (born 1997), Filipino actor and dancer
- Julian Turner, American singer
- Julian Scott (born 1956), British musical artist
- Julian Scott Urena, Dominican actor
- Julian Vedey (1898–1967), British actor
- Julian Velard (born 1979), American singer
- Julian Vergov (born 1970), Bulgarian actor
- Julián Villagrán (born 1973), Spanish actor
- Julian Voss-Andreae (born 1970), German sculptor
- Julian Wachner, American classical composer
- Julian Wadham (born 1958), English actor
- Julian Wagstaff, Scottish composer
- Julian Wass (born 1981), American musical artist
- Julian Waterfall Pollack (born 1988), American musical artist
- Julian Wehr (1898–1970), American artist
- J. Alden Weir (1852–1919), American painter
- Julian Whiterose (1880–1980), musical artist
- Julian Wintle (1913–1980), British film and TV producer
- Julian Woodrow (born 1996), American singer and songwriter
- Julian Woolford, British theatre director
- Julian Work (1910–1995), American classical composer

=== Politics ===
- Julian Adrat (born 1990), German politician
- Julian P. Alexander (1887–1953), American judge
- Julian Amery (1919–1996), British politician
- Julian Amos (born 1945), Australian politician
- Julian Ashby Burruss (1876–1947), the First President of James Madison University
- Julian Assange (born 1971), Australian Internet activist
- Julian T. Bailey (1859–?), American lawyer, professor and publisher
- Julian Bamberger, American politician
- Julian Batchelor (born 1958), New Zealand anti co-governance activist
- Julian Beale (1934–2021), Australian politician
- Julian Bennett (1929–2013), American politician
- Julián Besteiro (1870–1940), Spanish politician
- Julian Bond (1940–2015), African American civil rights leader
- Julian Bradley (born 1981), American politician
- Julian Brazier (born 1953), British Conservative Party politician
- Julian A. Brodsky (born 1933), American businessman
- Julian Brown (1850–1925), Australian politician
- Julian Brun (1886–1942), Polish journalist and politician
- Julian Bryant (1866–1932), American politician
- Julian Bullard (1928–2006), British diplomat
- Julian Burnside (born 1949), Australian barrister and King’s Counsel since 1989
- Julian Bushoff (born 1997), Dutch politician
- Julian Byng, 1st Viscount Byng of Vimy (1862–1935), British army officer and the 12th Governor General of Canada
- Julián Campo (born 1938), Spanish politician
- Julian Carr (1824–1886), Australian politician
- Julian Carroll (1931–2023), American politician
- Julian Castro (born 1974), American politician
- Julián Castro (1810–1875), Venezuelan military officer and politician
- Julian Cayo-Evans (1937–1995), Welsh political activist
- Julian Colombo, Argentinian politician
- Julian A. Cook (1930–2017), American judge
- Julian de Cordova (1851–1945), American businessman
- Julian Cyr (born 1986), American politician
- Julian Dixon (1934–2000), American politician
- Julián Domínguez (born 1963), Argentine politician
- Julian Doyle (1935–2007), Australian lawyer, politician and civil servant
- Julian Dufreche, Clerk of Court and President of the Board of Election Supervisors for Tangipahoa Parish, Louisiana
- Julian Dunkerton (born 1965), British businessman
- Julián Elorza Aizpuru (1879–1964), Spanish Carlist politician
- Julián Ercolini, Argentine judge
- Julian B. Erway (1899–1970), New York politician
- Julian Fane (1827–1870), British diplomat and poet
- Julian Fantino (born 1942), Canadian politician
- Julian Ferguson (1895–1965), Canadian politician
- Julian Flaux (born 1955), British Chancellor of the High Court
- Julian Frankel (1884/1885–1938), Lithuanian businessman
- Julian Front, Italian political party
- Julián García Valverde (born 1946), Spanish politician
- Julián García Vargas, Spanish politician
- Julian Gardner, Australian lawyer
- Julian Garrett (1940–2026), American politician
- Julian Gewirtz, American diplomat, historian and poet
- Julian Gibbs (1924–1983), American academic administrator
- Julian Goldsmid (1838–1896), British politician
- Julián Angulo Góngora (born 1953), Mexican lawyer and politician
- Julian Goose (born 1961), British judge
- Julian Grill (born 1940), Australian politician
- Julián Grimau (1911–1963), Spanish politician
- Julian Grobelny (1893–1944), Polish politician
- Julián Güitrón Fuentevilla, Mexican lawyer and politician
- Julian Harston (born 1942), British diplomat, peacekeeper, lecturer and mentor
- Julian Hartridge (1829–1879), American politician
- Julián Hernández Santillán (born 1963), Mexican politician
- Julian Hill (born 1973), Australian politician
- Julian Horn-Smith (born 1948), British businessman
- Julian Hunte (born 1940), Saint Lucian politician
- Julian Huppert (born 1978), British politician
- Julian Ivey (born 1995), American politician
- Julian Jacobs (1937–2025), American judge
- Julian King (born 1964), British diplomat
- Julian Knight (born 1972), British politician
- Julian Knowles (born 1969), British judge
- Julian Koziak (born 1940), Canadian politician
- Julian Kuo (born 1961), Taiwanese politician
- Julian Lane (1914–1997), American military officer and politician
- Julian L. Lapides (1931–2021), American politician
- Julian Leeser (born 1976), Australian politician
- Julian Leszczyński (1889–1939), Polish political activist
- Julian Lewis (born 1951), British Conservative politician
- Julián de Leyva (1749–1818), Argentine politician
- Julian Mack (1866–1943), US federal judge
- Julian Malins (born 1950), British barrister and former Governor of the Museum of London
- Julian Marchlewski (1867–1925), Polish politician and activist
- Julian McMahon, Australian barrister
- Julian L. McPhillips (1946–2025), American lawyer
- Julian Metcalfe (born 1959), British businessman
- Julian Mokoena, South African politician
- Julian Morse, Canadian politician
- Julian Moti (1965–2020), Solomon Islands attorney general
- Julián Muñoz (1947–2024), Spanish politician
- Julián Nazar Morales (born 1955), Mexican politician
- Julian Niemczyk (1920–2009), American diplomat
- Julian Nowak (1865–1946), Polish politician
- Julián Obiglio (born 1976), Argentine politician
- J. Owen Forrester (1939–2014), American judge
- Julian Pahlke (born 1991), German politician
- Julian Aldrin Pasha, Indonesian politician
- Julian Pauncefote, 1st Baron Pauncefote (1828–1902), British barrister, judge and diplomat
- Julian Pierce (1946–1988), American lawyer
- Julian Preidl (born 1995), German politician
- Julian M. Quarles (1848–1929), American politician
- Julian Radcliffe (born 1948), British businessman
- Julian Reed (1936–2022), Canadian politician
- J. Sargeant Reynolds (1936–1971), American politician
- Julián Ezequiel Reynoso (born 1952), Mexican politician
- Julian Rhodes (born 1969), English football chairman
- Julian Ridsdale (1915–2004), British politician
- Julian Roberts (born 1957), British businessman
- Julian Robinson (politician), Jamaican politician
- Julian Rose (born 1947), British businessman
- Julian Sidney Rumsey (1823–1886), American politician
- Julian Salomons (1835–1909), Australian politician
- Julián Sánchez Melgar (born 1955), Spanish judge and prosecutor
- Julian Larcombe Schley (1880–1965), American politician
- Julian Schmid (born 1989), Austrian politician
- Julián Serulle (born 1946), Dominican politician and lawyer
- Julián Šimko (1886–1956), Slovak politician
- Julian Simmonds (born 1985), Australian politician
- Julian Snow, Baron Burntwood (1910–1982), British politician
- Julian Soshnick (1932–2004), American lawyer
- Julian Steele (1906–1970), American politician
- Julian Stefani, Australian politician
- Julian Sturdy (born 1971), British Conservative politician
- Julian Tan, Malaysian politician
- Julian Teicke (born 1986), German businessman
- Julian Ogilvie Thompson (1934–2023), South African businessman
- Julian Toganivalu (1932–1977), Fijian chief, civil servant and politician
- Julián Trujillo Largacha (1828–1883), Colombian lawyer and statesman
- J. Vaughan Gary (1892–1973), American politician
- Julián Velázquez y Llorente (born 1944), Mexican politician
- Julian Vila Coma, Andorran diplomat
- Julián Villodas, mayor of Ponce, Puerto Rico
- Julián Volio Llorente (1827–1889), Costa Rican politician
- Julian F. Walker (1929–2018), British Arabist and diplomat
- Julian Webb (1911–2002), American politician
- Julian M. Wright (1884–1938), American judge advocate

=== Religion ===
- St. Julian of Toledo (642–690), a Christian saint
- Julian, bishop of Zaragoza (Spain) in 1077–1110
- St. Julian the Hospitaller, legendary Roman Catholic saint
- St. Julian of Le Mans, venerated as first bishop of Le Mans
- Julian of Norwich (1342 – c. 1413), woman English mystic
- Sts. Julian and Basilissa, fourth-century martyrs
- Julian of Eclanum (c. 386 – c. 455), bishop of Eclanum, leader of the Pelagians
- Julian of Antioch (of Cilicia, of Anazarbus)
- Friar Julian, Hungarian Dominican friar, explorer
- Julian I of Antioch, Syriac Orthodox patriarch
- Julian Cesarini, cardinal of the Roman Catholic Church
- Julián de Cortázar (1576–1630), Spanish-born prelate
- Julian Dobbs, Anglican bishop
- Julian Royds Gribble (1897–1918), recipient of the Victoria Cross
- Julian Henderson (born 1954), British Anglican bishop
- Julián Herranz Casado (born 1930), Spanish Catholic cardinal
- Julian Leow Beng Kim (born 1964), Malaysian archbishop
- Julian Marsham, 8th Earl of Romney (born 1948), English peer
- Julian Maunoir (1606–1683), French Jesuit priest
- Julian Sas-Kuilovsky (1826–1900), head of the Ukrainian Greek Catholic Church
- Julian Tenison-Woods (1832–1889), English Catholic priest and geologist
- Julian Wojtkowski (1927–2026), Polish Roman Catholic theologian and bishop

=== Sciences ===
- Julián Acuña Galé (1900–1973), Cuban botanist
- Julian Alston (born 1953), Australian American economist
- Julian Banzon (1908–1988), Filipino biochemist
- Julian Barbour (born 1937), British physicist
- Julian Blow (born 1961), molecular biologist
- Julian Chela-Flores (born 1942), Venezuelan astrobiologist
- Julian Cole (1925–1999), American mathematician
- Julian Coolidge (1873–1954), American mathematician
- Julian Crampton (1952–2019), British biologist and academic
- Julian Davies, British microbiologist
- Julian A. Dowdeswell (born 1957), British glaciologist
- Julian Earls (born 1942), American physicist
- Julian Eastoe (born 1965), British chemist
- Julian Ralph Ford (1932–1987), Australian chemist and ornithologist
- Julian Goldsmith (1918–1999), American mineralogist and geochemist
- Julian Gonsalves, Indian environmentalist
- Julian Heicklen (1932–2022), American chemist and civil liberties activist
- Julian W. Hill (1904–1996), American chemist, inventor of nylon
- Julian Hochberg (1923–2022), American psychologist
- Julian Hunt, Baron Hunt of Chesterton (1941–2026), British meteorologist
- Julian Huxley (1887–1975), English biologist and first director of UNESCO
- Julian Jack (born 1936), New Zealand physiologist
- Julian Jaynes (1920–1997), American psychologist
- Julian Paul Keenan (born 1969), neuroscientist
- Julian Keilson (1924–1999), American mathematician
- Julian Kenny (1930–2011), Trinidad and Tobago biologist and senator
- Julian Koenig, German scientist
- Julian Kwiek, Polish scientist and historian
- Julian Lewis (1946–2014), English developmental biologist
- Julian Herman Lewis (1891–1989), American pathologist
- Julian Lombardi (born 1956), American computer scientist
- Julian Ochorowicz (1850–1917), Polish philosopher, psychologist, inventor and publicist
- Julian Parkhill (born 1964), geneticist and working with pathogens
- Julian Pearce, British geochemist
- Julian Rappaport, American psychologist
- Julian Perry Robinson (1941–2020), British chemist
- Julian Rotter (1916–2014), American psychologist
- Julian Sahasrabudhe (born 1988), Canadian mathematician
- Julian Schwinger (1918–1994), Nobel Prize winning American physicist
- Julian Simashko (1821–1893), Russian zoologist and entomologist
- Julian Simon (1932–1998), American economist
- Julian Sochocki (1842–1927), Polish-Russian mathematician
- Julian Stanley (1918–2005), American psychologist
- Julian Alfred Steyermark (1909–1988), American botanist
- Julian Thomas, British archaeologist
- Julian Tudor-Hart (1927–2018), British general practitioner
- Julian Wright (born 1969), New Zealand economist

=== Sports ===
- Julián Acosta (1916–1983), Cuban baseball player and manager
- Julian Ahmataj (born 1979), Albanian footballer and manager
- Julian Alaphilippe (born 1992), French bicycle racer
- Julián Alfaro (born 2001), Chilean footballer
- Julián Alonso (born 1977), Spanish American tennis player
- Julian Alsford (born 1972), English footballer
- Julian Alsop (born 1973), English footballer
- Julian Altobelli (born 2002), Canadian soccer player
- Julian Álvarez (born 2000), Argentine Football Player
- Julián Andiano (born 1951), Spanish cyclist
- Julián Araujo (born 2001), Mexican footballer
- Julian Arnold (born 1999), American professional pickleball player
- Julian Arredondo (born 1988), Colombian cyclist
- Julian Ashby (born 2002), American football player
- Julian Astromov (1820–1913), Russian catholic priest
- Julián Aude (born 2003), Argentine footballer
- Julian Austin (born 1949), Canadian field hockey player
- Julián Ayala (born 1992), Mexican fencer
- Julian Azaad (born 1990), Argentine beach volleyball player
- Julian Baas (born 2002), Dutch footballer
- Julian Bailey (born 1961), British racing driver
- Julian Bailey (born 1978), Australian rugby league footballer
- Julián Barajas (born 1997), Mexican footballer
- Julian Baretta (born 1957), Canadian ice hockey player
- Julian Barham (born 1965), American tennis player
- Julián Bartolo (born 1996), Argentine footballer
- Julian Battle (born 1981), American gridiron football player
- Julian Baumgartner (born 1994), Austrian footballer
- Julian Baumgartlinger (born 1988), Austrian footballer
- Julian Bennett (born 1984), English footballer
- Julián Berrendero (1912–1995), Spanish cyclist
- Julián Bértola (1895–?), Uruguayan footballer and manager
- Julian Bibleka (born 1996), Albanian association footballer
- Julian Blackmon (born 1998), American football player
- Julian Bolling (born 1966), Sri Lankan swimmer
- Julian Börner (born 1991), German footballer
- Julián Bottaro (born 1992), Argentine footballer
- Julian Bousquet (born 1991), France international rugby league footballer
- Julian Boyd (born 1990), American basketball player
- Julian Bradley (born 1992), Irish tennis player
- Julian Brahja (born 1980), Albanian footballer and coach
- Julian Brandes (born 2004), Dutch footballer
- Julian Brandt (born 1996), German footballer
- Julian Bravo (born 2000), American soccer player
- Julián Brea (born 1999), Argentine footballer
- Julian Broddle (born 1964), English footballer
- Julian Brooke-Houghton (born 1946), British sailor
- Julian Bühler (born 1985), Swiss footballer
- Julián Calero (born 1970), Spanish footballer and manager
- Julián Camino (born 1961), Argentine footballer
- Julian Cardona (born 1990), American-born Puerto Rican footballer
- Julián Cardozo (born 1991), Argentine footballer
- Julián Carranza (born 2000), Argentine association football player
- Julian Carroll (born 1942), Australian swimmer
- Julian Cash (born 1996), British professional tennis player
- Julian Cassell (born 1967), English cricketer
- Julián Castillo (1880–1948), Cuban baseball player
- Julian Chabot (born 1998), German footballer
- Julian Chalias (born 2002), Indonesian basketball player
- Julian Champagnie (born 2001), American basketball player
- Julian Charles (born 1977), footballer from Saint Vincent and the Grenadines
- Julian Charles (born 1961), Saint Lucian cricketer
- Julian Chavez (born 2002), American soccer player
- Julian Cherel (born 1983), French footballer
- Julián Chicco (born 1998), Argentine footballer
- Julian Clarino (born 1995), Filipino footballer
- Julian Conze (born 1999), German footballer
- Julián Coronel (born 1958), Paraguayan footballer
- Julián Cosi (born 1998), Argentine footballer
- Julian Cradick (born 1947), English cricketer
- Julian Creus (1917–1992), British weightlifter
- Julián Cruz (born 1987), Colombian footballer
- Julián Cuesta (born 1991), Spanish footballer
- Julian Cumberbatch (1877–1944), Barbadian cricketer
- Julian Darby (born 1967), English footballer
- Julian Davies (born 1971), British judoka
- Julian Dean (born 1975), New Zealand cyclist
- Julián Delmás (born 1995), Spanish footballer
- Julian Derstroff (born 1992), German footballer
- Julián Di Cosmo (born 1984), Italian-Argentine footballer
- Julián Andrés Díaz (born 1989), Colombian footballer
- Julian Dicks (born 1968), English footballer and manager
- Julián Domínguez (born 1996), Argentine rugby union player
- Julian Dowe (born 1975), English footballer
- Julian Draxler (born 1993), German footballer
- Julián Duarte (born 1994), Mexican volleyball player
- Julian Dudda (born 1993), German footballer
- Julian Dunn (born 2000), Canadian soccer player
- Roberto Julián Duranona (born 1965), Cuban handball player
- Julian Eberhard (born 1986), Austrian biathlete
- Julian Edelman (born 1986), American football player
- Julian Emanuelson (born 1977), footballer
- Julian Engels (born 1993), German footballer
- Julian Erosa (born 1989), American mixed martial arts fighter
- Julián Estéban (born 1986), Swiss-Spanish footballer
- Julián Etulain (born 1988), Argentine golfer
- Julian Evetts (1911–1996), English cricketer
- Julián Fabelo (1890–?), Cuban baseball player
- Julian Fagan (born 1948), American football player
- Julian Faye Lund (born 1999), Norwegian football player
- Julian Feoli-Gudino (born 1987), Canadian football player
- Julián Fernández (born 1995), Dominican baseball player
- Julián Fernández (footballer, born 1989), Argentine footballer
- Julián Fernández (footballer, born 1995), Argentine footballer
- Julián Fernández (footballer, born 2004), argentine footballer
- Julian Fleming (born 2000), American football player
- Julian Fletcher (born 1990), Bermudian swimmer
- Julian Flügel (born 1986), German long-distance runner
- Julian Forte (born 1993), Jamaican sprinter
- Julian Gaines (born 2002), American soccer player
- Julian Gamble (born 1989), American basketball player in the Israeli Basketball Premier League
- Julián Ganzábal (born 1946), Argentine tennis player
- Julian Gardner, English poker player
- Julian Gërxho (born 1985), Albanian footballer
- Julian Gjeloshi (born 1974), Albanian footballer
- Julian Goater (born 1953), British long-distance runner
- Julian Golding (born 1975), English sprinter
- Julian Gölles (born 1999), Austrian footballer
- Julian Golley (born 1971), English athlete
- Julian Gómez (born 1978), Colombian-born American soccer player
- Julian Good-Jones (born 1997), American football player
- Julián Gorospe (born 1960), Spanish cyclist
- Julian Gray (born 1979), English footballer
- Julian Green (born 1995), American soccer player
- Julian Green (born 1965), British speed skater
- Julian Gressel (born 1993), professional soccer player
- Julian Grundt (born 1988), German footballer
- Julian Grupp (born 1991), German footballer
- Julián Guevara (born 1992), Colombian footballer
- Julián Guillermo (born 1990), Colombian footballer
- Julian Günther-Schmidt (born 1994), German footballer
- Julian Guttau (born 1999), German footballer
- Julian de Guzman (born 1981), Canadian soccer player
- Julian von Haacke (born 1994), German footballer
- Julian Hails (born 1967), English footballer
- Julian Hall (born 2008), American soccer player
- Julian Halls (born 1967), British field hockey player
- Julian Halwachs (born 2003), Austrian footballer
- Julian Hamati (born 1992), Albanian basketball player
- Julian Hammond (1943–2022), American basketball player
- Julian Hans (born 1985), French rugby union player
- Julian Hansen (born 1963), Faroese footballer
- Julian Hanses (born 1997), German racing driver
- Julian Hazel (born 1973), English footballer and manager
- Julian Heaven (born 2000), Australian rugby union player
- Julian Hermann (born 2001), Swiss footballer
- Julian Hettwer (born 2003), German footballer
- Julian Hill (American football) (born 2000), American football player
- Julian Hipwood (born 1946), British polo player and coach
- Julian Hodek (born 1998), German footballer
- Julian Hodgson (born 1963), English chess grandmaster and former British champion
- Julian Holland (born 1972), Australian boxer
- Julián Horta (born 1999), Colombian Greco-Roman wrestler
- Julian Houghton (1931–2004), New Zealand cricketer
- Julian Howard (born 1989), German long jumper
- Julian Howsare (born 1992), American gridiron football player
- Julian Humphrey (born 2003), American football player
- Julián Hurtado (born 1979), Colombian footballer
- Julian Huxley (born 1979), Australian rugby player
- Julian Hykes (born 1982), South African field hockey player
- Julián Illanes (born 1997), Argentine footballer
- Julian Illingworth (born 1984), American squash professional
- Julian Jackson (born 1960), Virgin Islands boxer
- Julian Jacobs (born 1994), American basketball player
- Julian Jakobs (born 1990), German footballer
- Julian Jakobsen (born 1987), Danish professional ice hockey winger
- Julian James (born 1970), English footballer
- Julian Jansen (born 2002), Dutch professional football player
- Julian Jasinski (born 1996), German basketball player
- Julián Javier (born 1936), Dominican baseball player
- Julian Jeang-Agliardi (born 2009), American skateboarder
- Julian Jeanvier (born 1992), Guinean footballer
- Julian Jefferson (1899–1966), English cricketer and British Army officer
- Julian Jenkins (born 1983), American football player
- Julian Jenner (born 1984), Dutch footballer
- Julian Joachim (born 1974), English footballer
- Julian Johnsson (born 1975), Faroese footballer
- Julian Justus (born 1988), German sports shooter
- Julian Justvan (born 1998), German footballer
- Julian Kelly (born 1989), English-born Irish footballer
- Julian Kern (born 1989), German road bicycle racer
- Julian Khazzouh (born 1986), Lebanese-Australian basketball player
- Julian King, American basketball player
- Julian Kirzner (born 1976), Australian rules footballer
- Julian Klymkiw (1933–2022), Canadian ice hockey player
- Julian Knowle (born 1974), Austrian tennis player
- Julian Knoll (born 1999), German footballer
- Julian Koch (born 1990), German footballer
- Julian Korb (born 1992), German footballer
- Julian Köster (born 1989), German handball player
- Julian Krinsky, American, former South African, professional tennis player
- Julian Kristoffersen (born 1997), Norwegian footballer
- Julian Krnjic (born 2000), Austrian association football player
- Julian Kulski (1892–1976), Polish resistance fighter
- Julian Kwit (born 1983), Polish Greco-Roman wrestler
- Julian Kwok (born 2010), Hong Kong Racing Driver
- Julian Kyer (born 1988), American bicycle racer
- Julián Ladera (1928–1973), Venezuelan baseball player
- Julián Lalinde (born 1985), Uruguayan footballer
- Julian Larsson (born 2001), Swedish footballer
- Julian Lawton, New Zealand sports shooter
- Julián Leal (born 1990), Colombian racing driver
- Julian Leist (born 1988), German footballer
- Julian Lelieveld (born 1997), Dutch footballer
- Julian Lenz (born 1993), German tennis player
- Julian Letterlough (1969–2005), American boxer
- Julian Lewis (American football) (born 2007), American college football quarterback
- Julian Lluka (born 1991), Albanian footballer
- Julian Loose (born 1985), German footballer
- Julián López (footballer, born 1987), Spanish footballer
- Julián López (footballer, born 2000), Argentine footballer
- Julián López Escobar (born 1982), Spanish bullfighter
- Julian Love (born 1998), American football player
- Julian Loveday (born 1963), Canadian rugby player
- Julian Lüftner (born 1993), Japanese snowboarder
- Julian Łukaszewicz (1904–1982), Polish middle-distance runner
- Julián Luque (born 1992), Spanish footballer
- Julian Lüttmann (born 1982), German footballer
- Julian Macaraeg (born 2003), Filipino-American short track speed skater
- Julián Magallanes (born 1986), Argentine footballer
- Julián Maidana (born 1972), Argentine footballer
- Julián Malatini (born 2001), Argentine footballer
- Julian Malo (born 1985), Albanian footballer
- Julián Manuele (born 1966), Argentine rugby union player
- Julián Marín (born 1989), Spanish football manager
- Julian Marquez (born 1990), American mixed martial artist
- Julián Martínez (born 1980), Spanish sprinter
- Julian Matthews (born 1988), New Zealand middle distance runner
- Julian Mavunga (born 1990), Zimbabwean-American basketball player
- Julian McGauran (born 1957), Australian politician
- Julian Melchiori (born 1991), Canadian ice hockey player
- Julian Merryweather (born 1991), American professional baseball player
- Julian Mertens (born 1997), Belgian cyclist
- Julian de Mey, Dutch cricketer
- Julian Michaux (1867–1925), Russian fencer
- Julian Michel (born 1992), French footballer
- Julián Miralles (born 1965), Spanish motorcycle racer
- Julián Miralles Rodríguez (born 1988), Spanish motorcycle racer
- Julián Molina (born 1998), Colombian BMX rider
- Julián Montenegro (born 1989), Argentine footballer
- Julián Montoya (born 1993), Argentine rugby union player
- Julian von Moos (born 2001), Swiss footballer
- Julián Morrinson (born 1951), Cuban discus thrower
- Julián Muñoz (born 1946), Costa Rican alpine skier
- Julian Murfett (1915–1982), Australian cricketer
- Julian Musiol (born 1986), German ski jumper
- Julian Nagelsmann (born 1987), German football manager
- Julian Nash (born 1983), American soccer player and US National Champion Footgolfer
- Julian Neal (born 2003), American football player
- Julian Newman (born 2001), American basketball player
- Julian Niehues (born 2001), German footballer
- Julian Norfleet (born 1991), American basketball player
- Julian Nunamaker (1946–1995), American football player
- Julian Ocleppo (born 1997), Italian tennis player
- Julian Okai (born 1993), English footballer
- Julian Okwara (born 1997), American football player
- Julián Olave (1884–1932), Spanish football manager and sports leader
- Julián de Olivares (1895–1977), Spanish fencer
- Julian O'Neill (born 1972), Australian international rugby league footballer
- Julian Orde (1917–1974), English poet, writer and actor
- Julian Page (born 1954), English cricketer and cricket administrator
- Julián Palacios (born 1999), argentine footballer
- Julian Palmieri (born 1986), French footballer
- Julian Paynter (born 1970), Australian long-distance runner
- Julian Pearce (born 1937), Australian field hockey player
- Julian Pearl (born 1999), American football player
- Julián Pérez, Cuban baseball player
- Julián Perujo (born 1985), Uruguayan footballer
- Julian Peterson (born 1978), American football player
- Julian Phillips (born 2003), American basketball player
- Julian Piggott (1888–1965), English cricketer
- Julian Pittman (born 1975), American football player
- Julian Pollersbeck (born 1994), German footballer
- Julian Portugal (born 1992), Mexican-Spanish footballer
- Julian Posey (born 1988), American gridiron football player
- Julian Prochnow (born 1986), German footballer
- Julián Ramírez (born 1999), Argentine footballer
- Julian Ranftl (born 1996), Austrian handball player
- Julián Rápalo (born 1986), Honduran footballer
- Julian Ratei (born 1988), German footballer
- Julian Rauchfuß (born 1994), German alpine skier
- Julian Real (born 1989), German water polo player
- Julian Redelinghuys (born 1989), South African rugby player
- Julian Reinard (born 1983), German footballer
- Julian Reister (born 1986), German tennis player
- Julián Retegi (born 1954), Spanish Basque pelota player
- Julian Reus (born 1988), German sprinter
- Julian Rieckmann (born 2000), German footballer
- Julian Riedel (born 1991), German footballer
- Julian Rijkhoff (born 2005), Dutch footballer
- Julian Ringhof (born 1989), German footballer
- Julian Ripoli (born 1992), French footballer
- Julian Robertson (born 1969), British badminton player
- Julián Robles (footballer) (born 1981), Spanish footballer
- Julián Rodas (born 1982), Colombian bicycle racer
- Julián Rodríguez (footballer, born 1997), Argentine professional footballer
- Julian Rojas (born 1978), Colombian taekwondo practitioner
- Julian Roloff (born 2001), German footballer
- Julian Rossi (born 1942), Australian boxer
- Julian Rowe (born 1985), Australian rules footballer
- Julián Rubio (born 1952), Spanish footballer and manager
- Julián Ruete (1887–1939), Spanish footballer, manager, referee and coach
- Julian Rufidis (born 2000), German footballer
- Julián Ruiz (born 1960), Spanish handball player
- Julian Rullier (born 1990), French footballer
- Julian Ryerson (born 1997), Norwegian footballer
- Julian Salamon (born 1991), Austrian footballer
- Julian Salatzki (born 1993), German ice dancer
- Julian Salvi (born 1985), Australian rugby union player and coach
- Julián Sánchez (cyclist) (born 1980), Spanish cyclist
- Julián Sánchez (diver) (born 1988), Mexican diver
- Julián Santero (born 1993), Argentine motor racing driver
- Julian Savea (born 1990), New Zealand rugby player
- Julian Sayin (born 2005), American football player
- Julian Schauerte (born 1988), German footballer
- Julian Schelb (born 1992), German cyclist
- Julian Schieber (born 1989), German footballer
- Julian von Schleinitz (born 1991), German luger
- Julian Schmid (born 1999), German Nordic combined skier
- Julian Schmidt (born 1994), German BMX rider
- Julian Schmitz (1881–1943), American gymnast
- Julian Schuster (born 1985), German footballer
- Julian Schwarzer (born 1999), Filipino footballer
- Julián Schweizer, Uruguayan surfer
- Julian Schwermann (born 1999), German footballer
- Julian Shackleton (born 1952), English cricketer
- Julian Snow (born 1964), English real tennis player
- Julian Solís (born 1957), Puerto Rican boxer
- Julián Sotelo (born 1965), Spanish javelin thrower
- Julian Soutter (born 1994), South African cricketer
- Julian Spence (1929–1990), American football player
- Julian Spence (runner) (born 1986), Australian long-distance runner
- Julián Speroni (born 1979), Argentine footballer
- Julian Stanford (born 1990), American football player
- Julian Stark (born 2001), German footballer
- Julian Stevenson, Irish field hockey player
- Julian Stöckner (born 1989), German footballer
- Julian Strawther (born 2002), American basketball player
- Julián Suárez (born 1991), Colombian cyclist
- Julian Suri (born 1991), American golfer
- Julián Tavárez (born 1973), Dominican baseball player
- Julian Talbot (born 1985), Canadian ice hockey player
- Julian Talley (born 1989), American football player
- Julian Theobald (born 1984), German racing driver
- Julian Thew, English poker player
- Julian Thompson, South African/English cricketer and physician
- Julian Troy (born 1972), Australian rugby league footballer
- Julian Uccello (born 1986), Canadian soccer player
- Julian Ulbricht (born 1999), German footballer
- Julian Usano (born 1976), Spanish cyclist
- Julian Valarino (born 2000), Gibraltarian footballer
- Julian Vandervelde (born 1987), American football player
- Julián Vara (born 1983), Spanish footballer
- Julian Vasey (1950–1979), British alpine skier
- Julian Vaughn (born 1988), American basketball player
- Julián Vázquez (born 2001), Mexican footballer
- Julian Veen Uldal (born 1997), Norwegian footballer
- Julián Velásquez (1920–?), Argentine fencer
- Julián Velázquez (born 1990), Argentine footballer
- Julián Estiven Vélez (born 1982), Colombian footballer
- Julian Venonsky (born 1993), American rower
- Julián Viáfara (born 1978), Colombian footballer
- Julian Vise (born 1945), Australian rules footballer
- Julián Vitale (born 1995), Argentine footballer
- Julian Wade (born 1990), Dominican footballer
- Julianus Wagemans (1890–1965), Belgian gymnast who competed in the 1920 Summer Olympics
- Julian Walker (born 1986), Swiss ice hockey player
- Julian Walsh (born 1996), Jamaican-born Japanese sprinter
- Julian Washburn (born 1991), American basketball player
- Julian Watts (born 1971), English footballer
- Julian Weber (born 1994), German javelin thrower
- Julian Weigel (born 2001), German footballer
- Julian Weigl (born 1995), German football player
- Julian Weiskopf (born 1993), Austrian footballer
- Julian Westermann (born 1991), German footballer
- Julian Wheeler (born 1971), American boxer
- Julian White (born 1973), British Lions and England international rugby union player
- Julian White (Australian footballer) (born 1946), Australian rules footballer
- Julian Wießmeier (born 1992), German footballer
- Julian Williams, multiple people
- Julian Wilson, multiple people
- Julian Winn (born 1972), Welsh cyclist
- Julian Winter (born 1965), footballer
- Julian Wood (born 1968), English cricketer
- Julian Woods (1887–1975), Australian cricketer
- Julian Wright (born 1987), American basketball player
- Julian Wruck (born 1991), Australian discus thrower
- Julian Yan (born 1965), baseball player
- Julian Yee (born 1997), first Malaysian figure skater to compete in the Olympics
- Julián Zea (born 1999), Colombian footballer
- Julian Zenger (born 1997), German volleyball player

=== Writers and journalists ===
- Julian Abele (1881–1950), Black American novelist
- Julian Allen (1942–1998), British-American illustrator
- Julián Ayesta (1919–1996), Spanish playwright and novelist
- Julian Baggini (born 1968), British philosopher, author and journalist
- Julian Bagley (1892–1981), American author and concierge
- Julian Barnes (born 1946), English writer
- Julian Bell (1908–1937), British poet
- Julian Borger, British journalist and writer
- Julian Brave NoiseCat (born 1993), journalist and activist
- Julián del Casal (1863–1893), Cuban writer
- Julian Claman (1918–1969), American novelist
- Julian Cribb, British-Australian science writer
- Julian Critchley (1930–2000), British journalist and Conservative Party politician
- Julian Croft (born 1941), Australian poet and academic
- Julián Cruz Balmaceda (1885–1947), Filipino writer
- Julian Davies (born 1954), Australian author
- Julián Delgado Lopera (born 1988), Colombian writer and performer
- Julian Dibbell (born 1963), American journalist
- Julian Evans, Australian writer and presenter
- Julian Fane (1927–2009), British author
- Julián Fuks, Brazilian writer
- Julian Gloag (1930–2023), English novelist and screenwriter
- Julian Glover, English journalist and speechwriter
- Julian Goodman (1922–2012), American journalist
- Julián Gorkin (1901–1987), Spanish writer
- Julian Guthrie, American journalist and author
- Julian Haviland (1930–2023), British journalist
- Julian Hawthorne (1846–1934), American journalist
- Julian Holland (born 1946), English author and artist
- Julian Holland (1925–2001), British journalist
- Julian Howard Ashton (1877–1964), English journalist, writer, artist and critic
- Julián Íñiguez de Medrano, author, poet and playwright
- Julian Klaczko (1825–1906), Polish author
- Julian Koenig (copywriter) (1921–2014), American copywriter
- Julian Kornhauser (born 1946), Polish poet and literary critic
- Julian Henry Lowenfeld (born 1963), American poet
- Julián Marchena (1897–1985), Costa Rican poet
- Julian Marshall, British journalist and radio broadcaster
- Julian Mitchell (born 1935), English playwright, screenwriter and novelist
- Julian Monson Sturtevant (1805–1886), American author and educator
- Julian More (1928–2010), British writer
- Julian Moynahan (1925–2014), American writer and critic
- Julian Notary (1455–1523), English printer and bookseller
- Julian Osgood Field (1852–1925), American novelist
- Julián Pérez Huarancca, Peruvian writer
- Julian Pettifer (born 1935), British journalist and TV presenter
- Julian Prejs (1820–1904), Polish journalist
- Julian Ralph (1853–1903), American journalist
- Julian Rathbone (1935–2008), English novelist
- Julian Reichelt (born 1980), German journalist
- Julian Rubinstein (born 1968), American journalist
- Julian Sanchez (born 1979), American writer
- Julian Selby (1833–1907), 19th-century journalist and writer in Columbia, South Carolina
- Julian Seward, compiler writer and free software contributor
- Julian Sher, Canadian investigative journalist, filmmaker, author and newsroom trainer
- Julian Simpson, British writer and director
- Julian Spalding (born 1947), British curator
- Julian de Stoop, Australian journalist
- Julian Stryjkowski (1905–1996), Polish journalist
- Julian Stuart (1866–1929), Australian writer, trade unionist and politician
- Julian Sturgis (1848–1904), American-born British novelist, poet and dramatist
- Julian Symons (1912–1994), English author
- Julian Tennyson (1915–1945), English writer and historian
- Julian Tepper (born 1979), American writer and musician
- Julian Turner (born 1955), British poet and mental health worker
- Julian Tuwim (1894–1953), Polish poet
- Julian Ursyn Niemcewicz (1758–1841), Polish poet, playwright and statesman
- Julian Waters, American calligrapher
- Julián Zugazagoitia (1899–1940), Spanish journalist and politician

=== Other ===
- Julian Agyeman (born 1958), British academic
- Julian Alford, U.S. Marine Corps general
- Julian Allwood, British engineer
- Julian Arnoldt-Russocki (1893–1953), officer of the Polish Army
- Julian Bannerman (born 1951), British garden designer and architect
- Julian Bartoszewicz (1821–1870), Polish historian
- Julian Bennett (1949–2025), British archaeologist
- Julian Besag (1945–2010), British statistician
- Julian Bickersteth (1885–1962), English Anglican priest, military chaplain and headmaster
- Julian Bicknell (born 1945), English architect
- Julian Bigelow (1913–2003), American computer engineer
- Julian Birkinshaw, British academic
- Julian Bleecker, American academic
- Julian Brown, English palaeographer
- Julian de Bruyn Kops (1862–1942), American architect
- Julian Buesink (1921–1998), American racing car owner
- Julian J. Bussgang (1925–2023), Polish-American businessman and writer
- Julian S. Carr (1845–1924), American industrialist and philanthropist
- Julián Casanova, Spanish historian
- J. A. C. Chandler (1872–1934), American historian, author and educator
- Julian Chorążycki (1885–1943), Polish Army doctor-in-chief
- Julian Chrysostomides (1928–2008), Greek historian
- Julian Cook (1916–1990), distinguished American Army officer of World War II who gained fame for his crossing of the Waal river during Operation Market Garden in September 1944
- Julian Cooper, British academic
- Julian Corbett (1854–1922), British naval historian and geostrategist
- Julian Cunningham (1893–1972), U.S. Army general
- Julian Eggebrecht, German video game businessman
- Julian F. Everett (1869–1955), American architect
- Julian Ewell (1915–2009), U.S. Army general
- Julian Farrand (1935–2020), English legal academic and solicitor
- Julian N. Frisbie (1894–1963), American general, commanding officer of the 7th Marine Regiment during the Battle of Cape Gloucester, warden of Southern Michigan Prison during 1952 riots
- Julian Gardner (born 1940), British art historian
- Julian Gascoigne (1903–1990), British Army officer
- Julian Gollop (born 1965), British video game designer
- Julian Grenfell (1888–1915), British soldier and war poet
- Julian Gumperz (1898–1972), German sociologist, publicist and political activist
- Julian Hall (1837–1911), British Army general
- Julian Hasler (1868–1915), British Army general
- Julian Hatcher (1888–1963), U.S. Army general
- Julian Higgins, British biostatistician
- Julian Hochfeld (1911–1966), Polish sociologist
- Julian Hodge (1904–2004), English/Welsh banker, businessman
- Julian Holbrook (1897–1980), British military personnel
- Julián Irízar (1869–1935), Argentine admiral
- Julian Jackson (1790–1853), British geographer
- Julian Jackson (born 1954), British historian
- Julian Johnson (1867–1939), American surgeon and author
- Julian C. Josey Jr. (1938-2021), American radiation oncologist
- Julian Kennedy (1852–1932), American engineer
- Julian Knight (born 1968), Australian mass murderer
- Julian Krzyżanowski (1892–1976), Polish scholar of literature and folklore
- Julian Lefay (1965–2025), video game programmer
- Julian Clarence Levi (1874–1971), American architect
- Julián Leyzaola (born 1960), Mexican police officer
- Julian Lim, American historian
- Julian Robert Lindsey (1871–1948), US Army general
- Julián Lombana (1839–1916), Colombian architect
- Julian Malonso (1923–2013), Filipino military man, educator and sports executive
- Julián Marías (1914–2005), Spanish philosopher
- Julian Marryshow (1918–2012), World War II fighter pilot from Grenada
- Julian Marshall (1836–1903), British music and print collector, tennis player and writer
- Julian Moser, German cinematographer
- Julian Myrick (1880–1969), American insurance salesman and tennis promoter
- Julian Nava (1927–2022), American educator and diplomat
- Julian Niccolini, American restaurateur
- Julian Nida-Rümelin (born 1954), German philosopher
- Julian Nott (1944–2019), American balloonist
- Julian Ochorowicz (1850–1917), Polish philosopher and psychologist
- Julian Adyeri Omalla, Ugandan businesswoman and entrepreneur (female)
- Julian Opuni, Ghanaian banker
- Julian Peddle (born 1954), British bus proprietor
- Julian Pęski (1859–1920), Polish surgeon
- Julian Peter (died 2023), Pakistani general
- Julian Peto, English statistician and cancer epidemiologist
- Julian Pitt-Rivers (1919–2001), British social anthropologist, ethnographer and professor
- Julian Pottage, renowned Bridge player
- Julian Potter (1858–1913), American banker and diplomat
- Julian Price (1867–1946), American insurance executive
- Julian Putkowski, British university teacher and military historian
- Julian Rayner, New Zealand malaria researcher
- Julian D. Richards, British archaeologist and academic
- Julian Richer, English retail entrepreneur, philanthropist and author
- Julian Robertson (1932–2022), American hedge fund manager
- Julián Romero (1518–1577), Spanish military commander
- Julian Roosevelt (1924–1986), American sailor and banker
- Julian Roth (1902–1992), American architect
- Julián Sánchez García, Spanish guerrilla and military officer
- Julian Savulescu (born 1963), Australian philosopher and bioethicist
- Julian Scheer (1926–2001), American merchant mariner, journalist, public relations professional and author
- Julian Scherner (1895–1945), SS officer
- Julian Scott (1846–1901), US Army Medal of Honor recipient
- Julian Serrano, Spanish chef
- Julian Simmons (born 1952), Northern Irish broadcaster
- Julian Smith (disambiguation), multiple people
- Julian Stallabrass, British art historian, photographer and curator
- Julian Steele (c. 1870–1926), British Army officer
- Julian Steward (1902–1972), American anthropologist
- Julian Swann, British historian and academic
- Julian Taylor (1889–1961), British surgeon
- Julian Thompson (born 1934), Royal Marines officer and historian
- Julian Togelius, video game researcher
- Julian Tregoning (born 1946), British merchant banker
- Julián Troncoso (1895–1983), Spanish military man and sports leader
- Julian Vannerson (1827–1875), American photographer
- Julian Wasser, American photographer
- Julian N. Wasserman (died 2003), American scholar
- Julian Waterman (1891–1943), American legal scholar
- Julian Edward Wood (1844–1921), American soldier and fraternity founder
- Julian L. Yale, Chicago railroad entrepreneur
- Julian Young (born 1943), American philosopher
- Julian E. Zelizer (born 1969), American political historian

== Fictional ==
=== Mononymous ===
- Julian, protagonist of the web manga Centuria
- Julian, a supporting character in Ice Age: Collision Course
- Julian, a Forsaken Light hero in Mobile Legends
- Julian and Sandy were regular characters in BBC Radio comedy Round the Horne
- Julian, a main character in the Canadian mockumentary Trailer Park Boys

=== With surname ===
- Julian Baker, character on the CW television series One Tree Hill
- Dr. Julian Bashir, chief medical officer of Star Trek: Deep Space Nine
- Julian Blackthorn, protagonist of Cassandra Clare's series The Dark Artifices
- Julian Clifton, character in Postman Pat and Special Delivery Service
- Julian "Bean" Delphiki, one of the main characters in Orson Scott Card's Ender's Game series
- Julian Keller (Hellion), a mutant character in Marvel Comics
- Julian Konzern, character from the anime and manga series Beyblade: Metal Masters
- Julian Kintobor, now known as Ivo Robotnik, the primary antagonist of the Sonic series
- Julian Pearce, main character of Apple TV show Servant
- Julian Santos, main masculine character of The Caraval Trilogy by Stephanie Garber
- Julian Sark, fictional character of the television series Alias
- Julian Star, the Cardcaptors name for the Cardcaptor Sakura character Yukito Tsukishiro, voiced by Sam Vincent

== See also ==
- Julian (disambiguation)
- Julian (surname)
- Jolyon
- Jullien
- Juliano (given name)
- Julian (surname)
