= Julián =

Julián is the Spanish equivalent of the name Julian. Notable people with the name include:

- Julián, Julián Cuesta, Spanish footballer
- Julián Orbón (1925–1991) Cuban composer
- Julián Carrón (1950) Spanish Catholic theologian
- Julián Robles (footballer) (1981) Spanish footballer
- Julián Vara (1983) Spanish footballer
- Julián Infante (1957–2000) Spanish guitarist and song writer
- Julián Marías (1914–2005) Spanish philosopher associated with the Generation of '36 movement
- Julián Herranz Casado (1930) Spanish Cardinal of the Catholic Church
- Julián Besteiro (1870–1940) Spanish socialist politician
- Julián Sánchez (cyclist) (1980) Spanish professional road bicycle racer
- Julián Grimau (1911–1963) Spanish Communist activist
- Julián Retegi (1954– ) ex-player of Basque pelota
- Julián Simón Spanish motorcycle racer
- Juli, Julián Cerdá Vicente (1981) Spanish footballer
- Julián de Olivares (1895–1977) Spanish fencer
- Julián Juderías (1877–1918) Spanish historian and sociologist
- Julián Zugazagoitia member of the Spanish Socialist Workers' Party, editor of the El Socialista
- Julián Miralles (1965) Spanish motorcycle racer
- Julián Palacios (1880-1947) Spanish mining engineer and businessman who was recognized as the 1st President of Real Madrid
- Julián Alvarez (2000) Argentine football player

== Arts & Entertainment ==
- Julián, a 2026 animated film

== See also ==
- San Julián (disambiguation), toponyms
