= Julian Thompson =

Julian Thompson may refer to:

- Julian Thompson (cricketer) (born 1968), former cricketer
- Julian Thompson (Royal Marines officer) (born 1934), military historian and former Royal Marines officer
- Julian Ogilvie Thompson (1934–2023), South African businessman
