= SC Kriens =

Swiss football club

Coordinates: 47°1′47.41″N 8°17′16.07″E

- Full name: Sport Club Kriens
- Founded: 1944; 82 years ago
- Ground: Stadion Kleinfeld; Kriens, Switzerland
- Capacity: 5,360 (540 seated)
- Chairman: Werner Baumgartner
- Manager: Michael Winsauer
- League: Swiss Challenge League
- 2025–26: 1st of 18 (Promoted)
- Website: https://sckriens.ch/
Home colours	Away colours

SC Kriens is a Swiss football club based in Kriens, Lucerne. Founded in 1944, the club will compete in the Swiss Challenge League, the second tier of Swiss football, for the 2026–27 season following promotion from the Promotion League. The team plays its home matches at Stadion Kleinfeld and maintains a local rivalry with FC Luzern.

SC Kriens women's team has been participating in the Nationalliga A since 2008.

== History ==
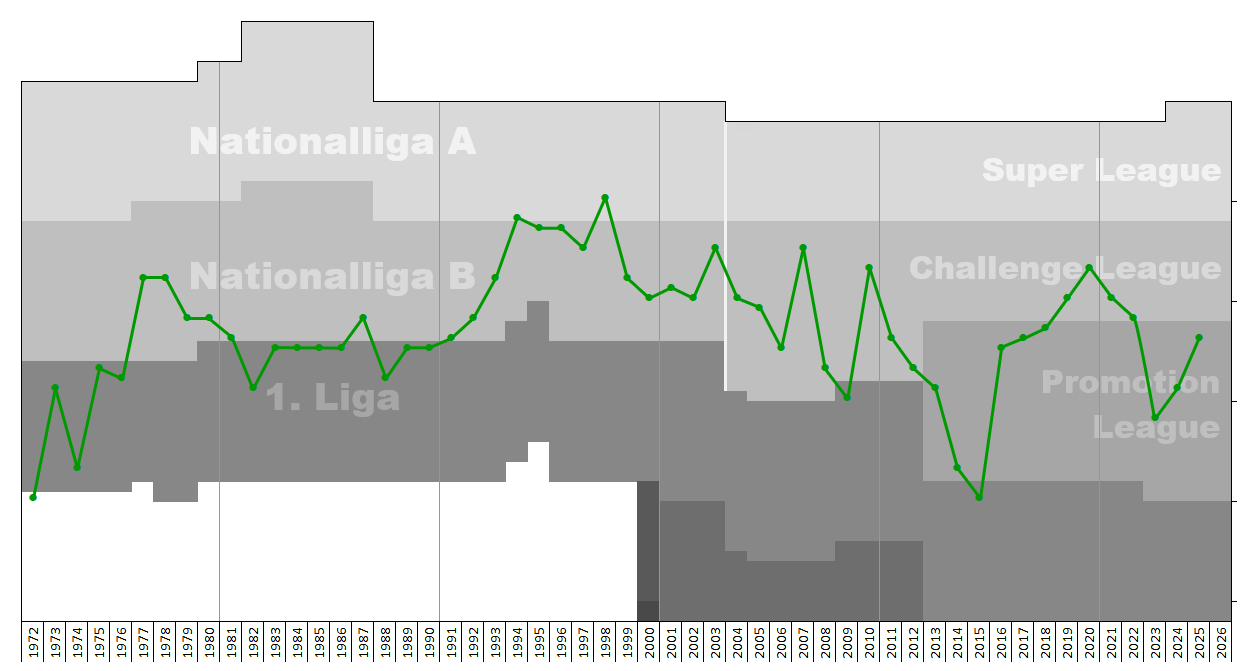
Chart of SC Kriens table positions in the Swiss football league system

The first club to be formed in Kriens was created in 1920 as Fussball Club Kriens, albeit folding in 1926, and succeeded by Rasensportclub Kriens between 1931 and 1939. The team as it exists today was founded on 14 June 1944. They initially played in Lucerne, before being granted a meadow at a site now named Kleinfeld in 1949, where they have played since.

Their first years were unremarkable, but support from the local municipality, a new stadium, and the introduction of several junior teams helped them to promotion to the 2. Liga in 1958. By 1975 the team challenged for promotion to the Nationalliga B under Paul Wolfisberg, who later managed FC Lucerne and the Swiss national team, before succeeding a year later in the 1975–76 season. As Wolfisberg left the team in 1978 and the core of homegrown players began to age, they fought against relegation, which became reality in 1981. They spent another single season in the second division in 1986–87, before achieving a more successful stint in 1990 that eventually led to two spells in the Nationalliga A in the 1993–94 and 1997–98 seasons. The team nearly achieved promotion on multiple occasions, albeit without success, under the leadership of managers such as Kudi Müller and Jürgen Seeberger. However, they failed to make the cut after the second division was restructured from 16 to 10 teams in 2012 and spent several years in lower divisions until 2018.

== Stadium ==
SC Kriens play at the Stadion Kleinfeld, which hosts a capacity of 5,370. It was originally known as the Waisenhausmatte, which was first opened on 7 August 1949. It received its first floodlights in 1950, and by 1958, the stadium reopened under its current name with an expanded seating of 700. In 1969, two further pitches and the main stand were added. In 2018 the stadium was completely rebuilt including a new main stand which includes a built-in sports centre and a photovoltaic system on its roof.

== Current squad ==
As of 26 September 2026

Note: Flags indicate national team as defined under FIFA eligibility rules; some limited exceptions apply. Players may hold more than one non-FIFA nationality.

No.	Pos.	Nation	Player
1	GK	SUI	Ruben Salchli (on loan from Young Boys)
3	DF	GER	Kevin Tröndle
4	DF	SUI	Manuel Fäh
5	DF	MEX	Mauricio Willimann
7	MF	SUI	Lukas Riedmann
8	MF	SUI	Alejandro Willimann
9	FW	SUI	Luka Slišković
11	MF	SUI	Malek Ishuayed (on loan from Servette)
12	MF	FRA	Martin François
13	FW	KOS	Leandro Maksutaj (on loan from Winterthur)
14	DF	SUI	Marvin Akahomen (on loan from Basel)
15	DF	SUI	Enea Heiniger
17	FW	SUI	Albin Krasniqi

No.	Pos.	Nation	Player
18	GK	GER	Patrick Zajac
19	FW	SUI	Rrezart Hoxha
20	FW	SUI	Célien Wicht
21	DF	SUI	Bleron Mulliqi
22	GK	SUI	Tobias Mauch
23	DF	SUI	Julian Hermann
24	DF	SUI	Lorin Jetzer
25	DF	SUI	Yuro Bohon Diet (on loan from Zürich)
26	MF	SUI	Luca Romano
27	MF	SUI	Elio Rufener (on loan from Young Boys)
28	FW	SUI	Pascal Utz (on loan from Zürich)
29	DF	FRA	Daoud Touré
30	MF	SUI	Nico Siegrist

=== Out on loan ===
Note: Flags indicate national team as defined under FIFA eligibility rules; some limited exceptions apply. Players may hold more than one non-FIFA nationality.

No.	Pos.	Nation	Player
—	MF	SUI	Leandro Aversa (at Langenthal until 30 June 2027)
