= Julian Williams =

Julian Williams may refer to:

- Julian Williams (American football) (born 1990), Arena Football League player
- Julian Williams (boxer) (born 1990), American professional boxer
