= Julian Lluka =

Albanian footballer

Personal information
- Full name: Julian Abaz Lluka
- Date of birth: 14 February 1991 (age 35)
- Place of birth: Gjirokastër, Albania
- Position: Midfielder

Senior career*
Years	Team	Apps	(Gls)
2011–2013	Luftëtari	36	(3)
2013–2014	Dinamo Tirana	4	(0)
2014–2015	Luftëtari	21	(1)
2015–2016	Apolonia	19	(0)
2016	Luftëtari	3	(0)
2017	Sopoti	9	(0)
2017-2018	Shkumbini	1	(0)
- * Club domestic league appearances and goals as of 8 December 2016

Julian Lluka (born 14 February 1991) is an Albanian footballer who most recently played for Shkumbini Peqin as a midfielder.
