= Julian Page =

English cricketer and cricket administrator

Personal information
- Full name: Julian Thomas Page
- Born: 1 May 1954 (age 72); Clifton, Bristol, England
- Batting: Left-handed
- Bowling: Left-arm medium

Domestic team information
- Years: Team
- 1974: Gloucestershire
- 1974: Cambridge University

Career statistics
Competition	First-class	List A
Matches	2	2
Runs scored	31	0
Batting average	7.75	0.00
100s/50s	–/–	–/–
Top score	11	0
Balls bowled	168	60
Wickets	1	0
Bowling average	95.00	–
5 wickets in innings	–	–
10 wickets in match	–	–
Best bowling	1/14	–
Catches/stumpings	–/–	–/–
- Source: Cricinfo, 25 September 2020

Julian Thomas Page (born 1 May 1954) is an English former first-class cricketer.

Page was born in the Bristol suburb of Clifton. He later studied at the University of Cambridge, attending Sidney Sussex College. While studying at Cambridge, Page played first-class cricket twice for Cambridge University in 1974, against Leicestershire and Nottinghamshire. In addition to playing first-class cricket in 1974, Page also made two appearances in List A one-day cricket, making one appearance each for Cambridge University against Kent in the Benson & Hedges Cup and for Gloucestershire against Lancashire in the John Player League.
