= Julián Molina =

Colombian BMX rider

Personal information
- Nationality: Colombian
- Born: 24 November 1998 (age 26); Andes, Colombia
- Occupation: Professional BMX Athlete

Sport
- Sport: Freestyle BMX, Dirt jumping
- Event: X Games

Julián Molina (born 24 November 1998) is a Colombian professional BMX rider who has gained recognition at the X Games. He has represented Colombia in international competitions. He competed in the time trial event and the racing event at the Sosh Urban Motion in Paris 2015.
