= Julian Knoll =

German footballer

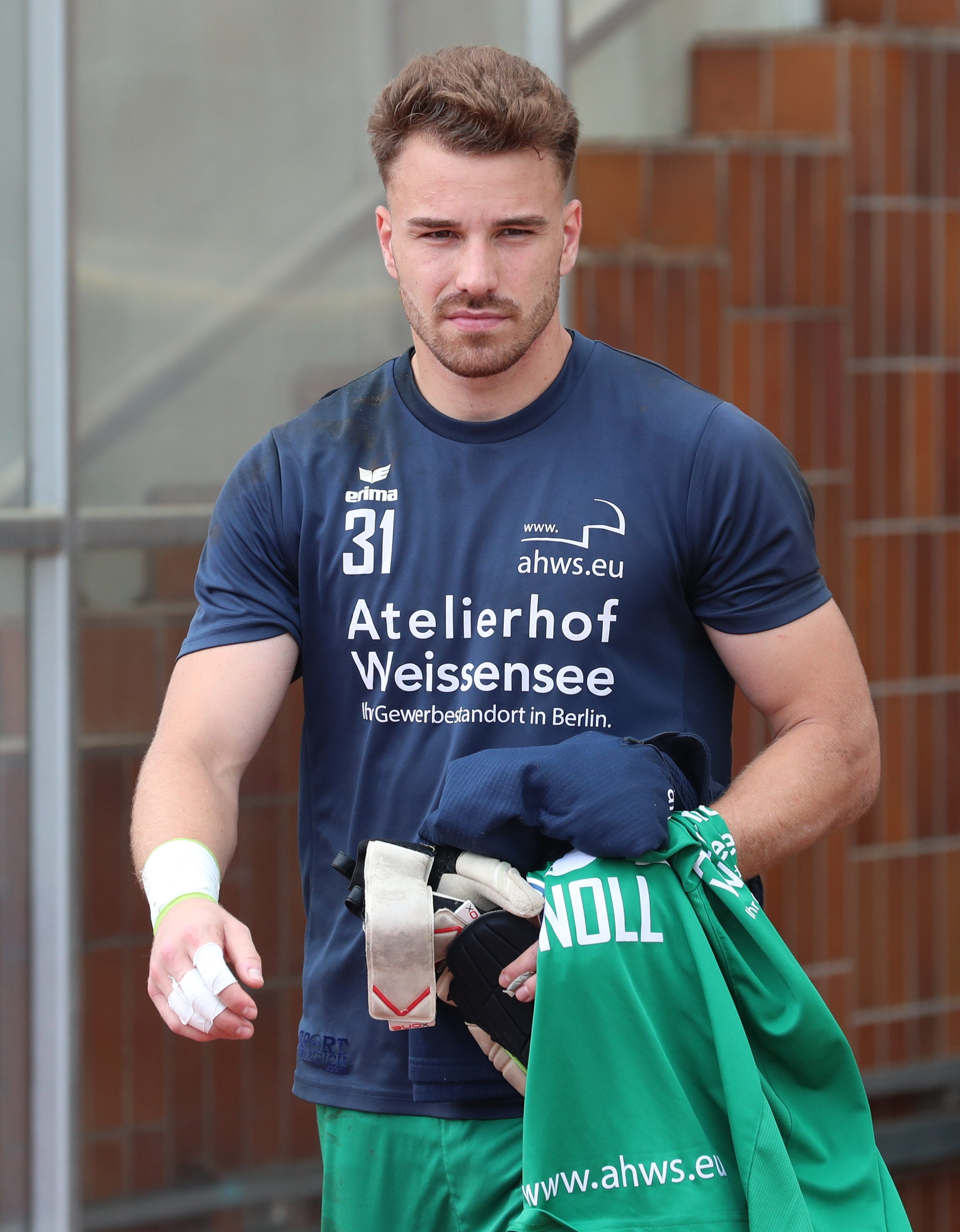

Personal information
- Full name: Julian Knoll
- Date of birth: 11 July 1999 (age 27)
- Place of birth: Gotha, Germany
- Height: 1.90 m (6 ft 3 in)
- Position: Goalkeeper

Team information
- Current team: SV 09 Arnstadt
- Number: 99

Youth career
- –2012: FSV 06 Ohratal
- 2012–2018: Rot-Weiß Erfurt

Senior career*
Years	Team	Apps	(Gls)
2017–2020	Rot-Weiß Erfurt	11	(0)
2020	Inter Leipzig	2	(0)
2020–2022	VSG Altglienicke	7	(1)
2022–2024	FSV 06 Ohratal	46	(1)
2024–	SV 09 Arnstadt	11	(0)
- * Club domestic league appearances and goals as of 19:06, 14 January 2025 (UTC)

Julian Knoll (born 11 July 1999) is a German footballer who plays as a goalkeeper for SV 09 Arnstadt.

== Career ==
=== Club career ===
Knoll first played for FSV 06 Ohratal before moving to FC Rot-Weiß Erfurt in 2012. From 2016 he played for U19s and trained for the first time with the clubs professional team.

On 22 January 2018 he made his debut for the first team in the 3. Liga in a 3–1 win against 1. FC Magdeburg due to a yellow card suspension for first choice goalkeeper Philipp Klewin. Although Klewin was ready for action again in the following game, Knoll was again given preference. However, he injured himself during the warm-up right before the game and was out for the rest of the season.

After Erfurt was relegated to the Regionalliga Nordost, Knoll signed a new professional contract with the club. With the withdrawal of the first team in January 2020, Knoll moved to NOFV-Oberliga Süd club Inter Leipzig. In the summer 2020, he joined VSG Altglienicke. Two years later, in June 2022, he returned to his childhood club, FSV 06 Ohratal.

In the summer 2024, Knoll moved to SV 09 Arnstadt.
