= Julián Fabelo =

Cuban baseball player (born 1890)

- Right fielder / Third baseman / Pitcher
- Born: March 19, 1890; Santa Clara, Cuba
- Died: Unknown
- Batted: Right Threw: Right

Negro league baseball debut
- 1916, for the Cuban Stars (East)

Last appearance
- 1923, for the Cuban Stars (East)
- Stats at Baseball Reference

Teams
- Cuban Stars (East) (1916–1917, 1920–1921, 1923)

Julián Ramiro Fabelo (March 19, 1890 – death unknown) was a Cuban professional baseball right fielder, third baseman and pitcher in the Negro leagues between 1916 and 1923.

A native of Santa Clara, Cuba, Fabelo played for Club Fé in the Cuban League in 1912–1913. He made his Negro leagues debut in 1916 for the Cuban Stars (East), and played several seasons for the Stars through 1923.
