= Julian Teicke =

German businessman

- Born: October 10, 1986 (age 39); Berlin, Germany
- Education: University of St. Gallen
- Occupation: Entrepreneur
- Organization: wefox
- Known for: Founder & CEO of wefox

Julian Teicke (10 October 1986) is a German entrepreneur who was the founder and CEO of wefox. He is also an investor and board member of several European tech startups.

In 2022, he was recognised with one of the "40 under 40" awards by Capital Magazine. He is also a columnist at Forbes Magazine.

== Career ==
In 2009, Teicke played an active role in starting up the UK branch of Chocri, a chocolate company based in Berlin. He later joined Groupon where he headed up the European sales operation.

In 2010, he joined the e-commerce platform DeinDeal in Switzerland.

Teicke served as the DeinDeal's COO until it was sold to media publisher Ringier for an undisclosed sum in 2015.

In 2015, Teicke founded FinanceFox, a company that initially offered customers the ability to manage their insurance contracts online. In the following years, the company received permission to sell insurance products and rebranded as wefox. Since its launch in 2015, wefox has doubled its yearly revenues, reaching $580 million in 2022, and serving more than 3 million customers across Austria, Germany, Italy, Poland, The Netherlands, and Switzerland. wefox was the fastest European fintech to ever reach $1bn valuation and in 2022 had a valuation of $4.5bn.

=== The Delta ===
Since 2015, Julian Teicke has been a founder, partner, & non-Executive Chairman at The Delta. The Delta has incubated wefox and has since incubated and invested in more than 50 ventures. Julian Teicke is founding angel and Non-Executive board member of several The Delta portfolio companies.

== Recognition ==
Julian Teicke has been honored with the title of Swiss e-Commerce Champion and received the Swiss e-Commerce award for two consecutive years, in 2013 and 2014.

In 2020, he was awarded with the "Founder of the Year" Award of the University of St. Gallen.

== Criticism ==
In 2023 Julian Teicke and wefox were criticised by media outlets for their aggressive acquisition strategy and that the acquired companies did not yet fully adopt wefox technology.

== Volunteering ==
In April 2020, Teicke founded Healthy Together (a non-profit European tech alliance) by supporting the design and launch of the Corona-Warn-App. After this he co-founded Luca App, which belongs to the most successful apps in Germany with more than 40 million downloads.

Teicke is also a board member of the Jewish Museum of Berlin.
