= Julián Marin =

Spanish singer-songwriter

- Born: Reus, Spain
- Genres: Pop, electronic, R&B, dance, independent music, guaracha
- Occupation: Singer
- Instrument: Vocals
- Years active: 2010–present

Julián Marin (born in Reus, Spain), is a Spanish singer, songwriter and producer.

== Career ==
During 2014 he was the radio presenter of the music section on the radio program "Me lo dices o me lo cuenta" on LaMasterFM radio in Madrid, and a year later, in 2015 he presented the music news on the Radio program "Entre la gente" in the radio of Madrid 10Radio.

The first single was entitled "dame tu calor" in 2016, a benefit single for the fight against cancer that managed to be in the TOP20 in the charts of iTunes of Spain the day of its release. The single earned three nominations: Artist revelation in EDM RADIO, candidate for the "imprescicible" awards of ReusTV and finally, best videoclip in the film festival in Zaragoza this 2016.

Marin was one of the candidates in the Eurocasting organized by RTVE to represent Spain in the Eurovision Song Contest 2017 in Kyiv.

== Featured singles ==
Year	Title	charts in Spain
2016	Dame tu calor	5
2016	Esta noche	20
2017	Acurrucate RMX ( ft Katia aveiro ft DKB	10
2019	Candy	7
2019	Me porto Mal	5
2019	Dime cómo Hacer	20
2020	Presumo	23
2021	Si me tientas	1
2022	Desacatao	5
2022	Desacatao ( Chill remix)	5
2023	Flor de loto	4
2024	El Jefe	2
