= Julian Hermann =

Swiss footballer (born 2001)

Personal information
- Date of birth: 26 May 2001 (age 25)
- Place of birth: Ebikon, Switzerland
- Height: 1.80 m (5 ft 11 in)
- Position: Midfielder

Team information
- Current team: Kriens
- Number: 23

Youth career
- 2007–2014: Ebikon
- 2014–2017: Kriens
- 2017–2020: Luzern

Senior career*
Years	Team	Apps	(Gls)
2019–2021	Luzern U21	21	(5)
2020–2021	Luzern	1	(0)
2021–2022	Cham	30	(1)
2022–	Kriens	112	(5)
- * Club domestic league appearances and goals as of 28 September 2026

Julian Hermann (born 26 Mai 2001) is a Swiss footballer who plays as a midfielder for Kriens.

== Club career ==
Hermann is a youth product of his local clubs Ebikon and then Kriens, before joining the academy of Luzern at the age of 17. He started playing for their U21 squad in the Swiss 1. Liga in 2019. He made his professional debut with Luzern in a 0–0 Swiss Super League tie with FC Basel on 3 August 2020.

On 20 July 2021, he moved to Cham in the third-tier Swiss Promotion League.

On 23 June 2022, Hermann returned to his youth club Kriens.
