= Julian Frankel =

Lithuanian businessman (1884/5–1938)

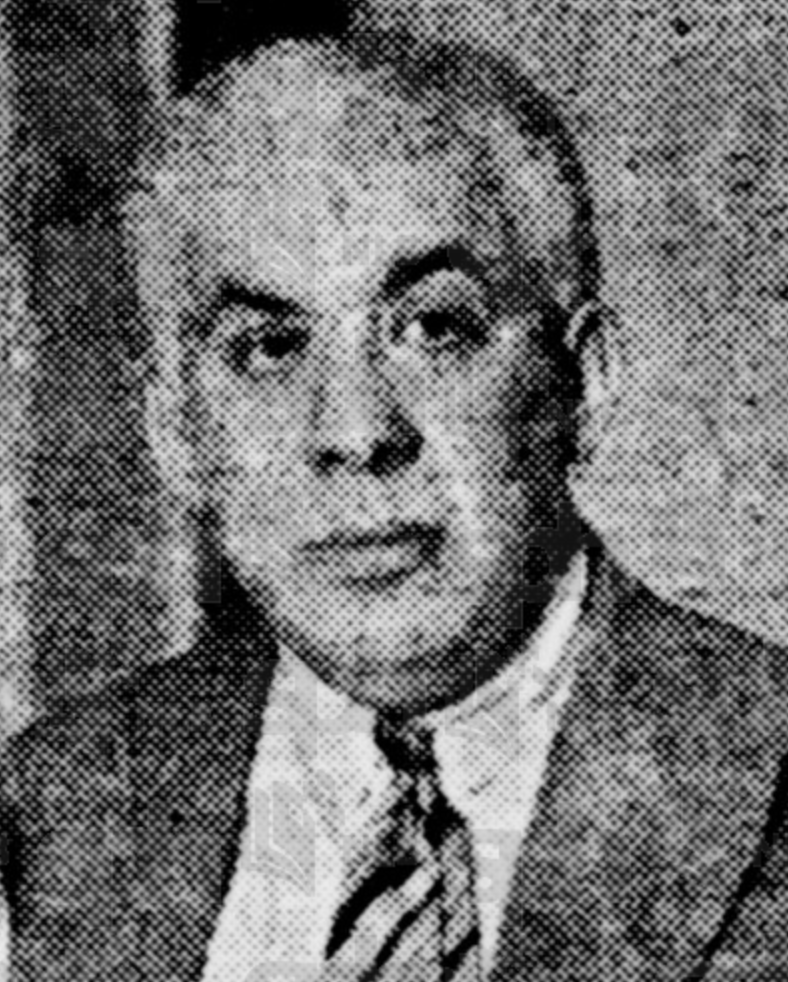
Julian Frankel

Julian Frankel (1884 or 1885 – 14 August 1938) was a businessman, boxing promoter and leader of the Jewish community of Singapore.

== Early life and education ==
Frankel was born in Druskininkai. He was the son of Abraham Frankel and his wife Rosa, and the brother of David Frankel. He went to Copenhagen on an apprenticeship course in cabinetmaking.

== Career ==
In 1918, following the retirement of his father, he and David took over the family business and renamed it the Frankel Brothers. He took over the business himself in the 1930s, renaming it to Julian Frankel and Company. He established his own factory and store, which he named the Julian Frankel Furniture Company, on 13 Lloyd Road.

Frankel was a prominent promoter of boxing in Singapore. He also helped to found the Singapore Billiards Association.

== Personal life and death ==
Frankel married Tila Storch on 11 December 1910. They had a daughter.

Frankel died at his residence in Siglap on 14 August 1938. Following his death, the family business was liquidated.
