= Julian Wright (economist) =

New Zealand economist

Julian Wright (born 18 March 1969 in New Zealand) is a Singapore-based academic and economist. He is the Lim Chong Yah Professor at the National University of Singapore and was head of the Department of Economics from 2012 to 2019.

Wright completed a Bachelor of Science with honors at University of Canterbury in 1991. In 1996, he completed a doctorate at Stanford University. Wright works in the area of industrial organization, and specializes in the economics of multi-sided platforms such as online marketplaces, payment platforms, and booking platforms. He has consulted on the economics of platforms, and related competition policy and regulatory matters.

He is currently co-editor of the International Journal of Industrial Organization, a Singapore Competition Appeal Board Member, an Energy Market Authority Board Member and a member of NUS Alumni Ventures.
