= Julian Bibleka =

Albanian footballer (born 1996)

Personal information
- Date of birth: 4 May 1996 (age 30)
- Place of birth: Barilevë, FR Yugoslavia
- Height: 1.88 m (6 ft 2 in)
- Position: Goalkeeper

Team information
- Current team: 1. FC Kaan-Marienborn
- Number: 1

Youth career
- SSV Frohnhausen
- JSG Mittenaar/Siegbach/Burg
- VfB Gießen
- –2010: TSG Wieseck
- 2010–2015: Eintracht Frankfurt

Senior career*
Years	Team	Apps	(Gls)
2015	05 Oberrad	19	(0)
2016–2019	TSV Steinbach	8	(0)
2019	Rot-Weiß Koblenz	4	(0)
2020–	1. FC Kaan-Marienborn	30	(0)

International career^{‡}
2012	Albania U17	1	(0)
2014	Kosovo	1	(0)
- * Club domestic league appearances and goals as of 1 July 2022 ‡ National team caps and goals as of 25 May 2014

Julian Bibleka (born 4 May 1996), is a Kosovar professional footballer who plays as a goalkeeper for German club 1. FC Kaan-Marienborn. He made one appearance for the Kosovo national team in 2014.

== Club career ==
=== Early career ===
Bibleka started his youth career at SSV Frohnhausen, a local academy in Germany. Then he played for various fellow German club academies such as JSG Mittenaar/Siegbach/Burg, VfB Gießen, TSG Wieseck, before he joined the Eintracht Frankfurt academies in 2010. With Eintracht Frankfurt Bibleka won the Hessen cup by defeating FSV Frankfurt U-19 3–1 in a match in which Bibleka was considered decisive with several saves.

== International career ==
Being of Albanian descent, in April 2013 Bibleka participated in a gathering of young Albanians footballers born in 1997–1998 and 1995–1996 even, organised by the FSHF (Albanian Football Association) in Switzerland with the participations of the Albania national under-17 football team and Albania national under-19 football team respective coaches at the time, Džemal Mustedanagić and Foto Strakosha. Bibleka became one of 12 young talents suggested to FSHF by Jetmir Salihu (a simple Albanian football fan part of Tifozat Kuq e Zi, which later became a representative of FSHF for Kosovo) to be selected to the Albania national youth football teams at least one time.

=== Kosovo ===
Bibleka was called up to Kosovo national team by coach Albert Bunjaki for the two FIFAs sanctioned matches against Turkey and Senegal in May 2014. He made it his debut for Kosovo on 25 May 2014 against Senegal, coming on as a substitute in the 79th minute in place of Kushtrim Mushica in a 3–1 loss.

== Career statistics ==
=== Club ===
As of 1 July 2015

Appearances and goals by club, season and competition
Club	Season	League			National cup		Europe		Total	
Club	Season	Division	Apps	Goals	Apps	Goals	Apps	Goals	Apps	Goals
SpVgg 05 Oberrad	2015–16	Hessenliga	0	0	0	0	–		0	0
Career total			0	0	0	0	0	0	0	0

=== International ===
As of 25 May 2014

Appearances and goals by national team and year
National team	Year	Apps	Goals
Kosovo	2014	1	0
Total		1	0
