= Julian Weigel =

German footballer (born 2001)

Personal information
- Date of birth: 14 July 2001 (age 25)
- Height: 1.89 m (6 ft 2 in)
- Position: Midfielder

Team information
- Current team: FSV Schöningen
- Number: 26

Youth career
- 2007–2018: Rot-Weiß Erfurt
- 2018–2020: 1. FC Magdeburg

Senior career*
Years	Team	Apps	(Gls)
2020–2021	1. FC Magdeburg	5	(1)
2021	→ Germania Halberstadt (loan)	0	(0)
2021–2022	Germania Halberstadt	26	(4)
2022–2024	1. FC Lokomotive Leipzig	43	(1)
2024–2026	BSG Chemie Leipzig	38	(0)
2026–	FSV Schöningen	8	(0)
- * Club domestic league appearances and goals as of 22 September 2026

Julian Weigel (born 14 July 2001) is a German professional footballer who plays as a midfielder for FSV Schöningen.

== Career statistics ==
As of 17 June 2020

Appearances and goals by club, season and competition
Club	Season	League			Cup		Continental		Other		Total	
Club	Season	Division	Apps	Goals	Apps	Goals	Apps	Goals	Apps	Goals	Apps	Goals
1. FC Magdeburg	2019–20	3. Liga	1	1	0	0	–		0	0	1	1
Career total			1	1	0	0	0	0	0	0	1	1
