= Julian Schmid (politician) =

Austrian politician (born 1989)

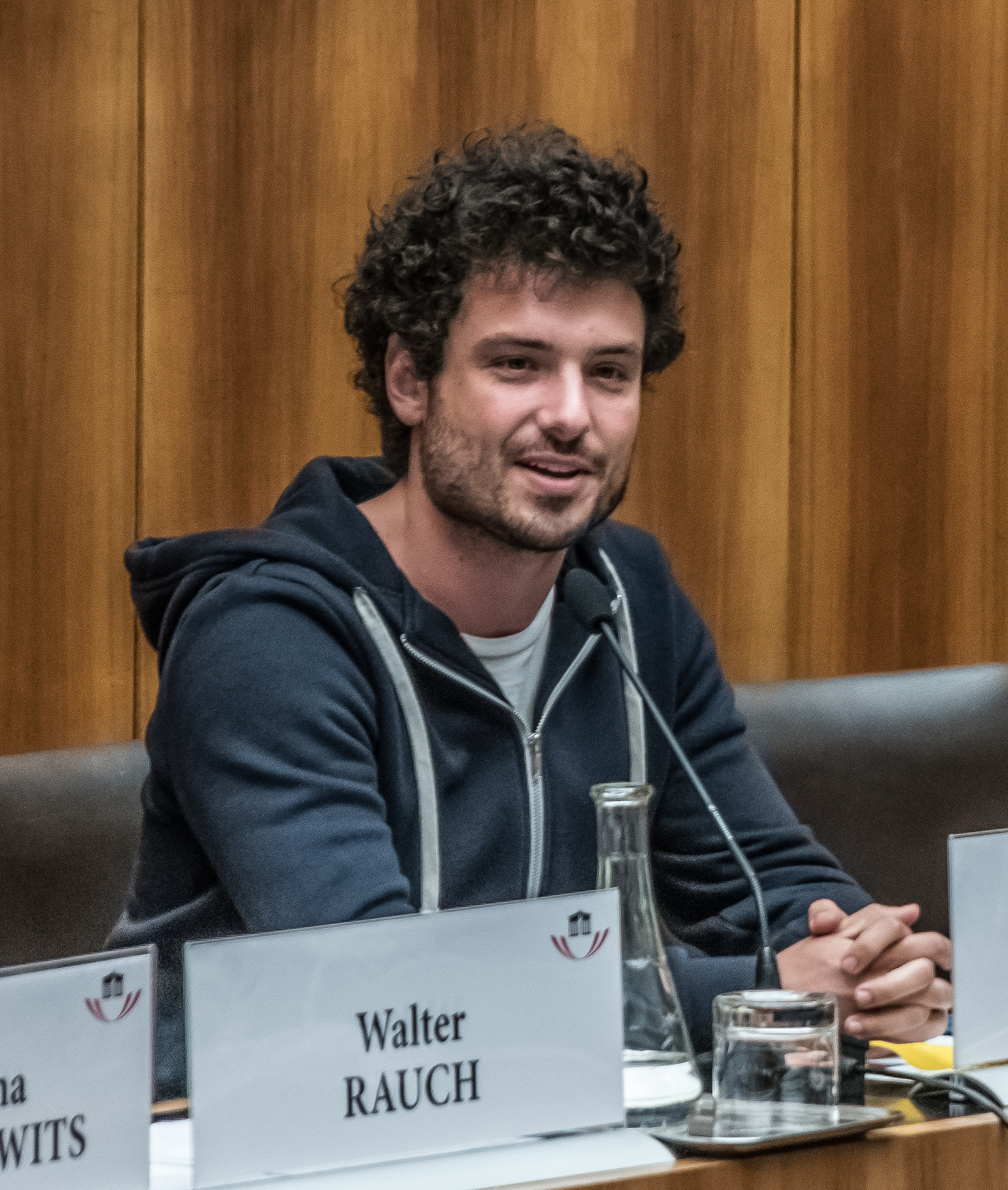
Julian Schmid in the Young Parliament on 10 June 2016 in the National Council

Julian Schmid (born 21 April 1989, in Klagenfurt am Wörthersee) is an Austrian politician from the Greens. He was a member of the Austrian National Council from 2013 until 2017.

== Biography ==
Schmid attended BRG Klagenfurt-Viktring from 1999 until 2007. In the 2006/07 school year was a Carinthian Landesschulsprecher of the independent student list "Farblos". In 2008 he performed his community service in the youth center "Arche" in Feldkirchen in Kärnten. From October 2008 he studied political science at the University of Vienna, where he graduated as a bachelor in 2012. Until 2013, he also studied economics.

In 2009, he was a substitute member of the Klagenfurt Town Council. Furthermore, he was a district councilor in Vienna-Wieden from 2010 to 2013.

Schmid has been a member of the Austrian National Council since 29 October 2013 till the elections in 2017. When Schmid became a member, he was the youngest male member of the National Council at the age of 24. During the election campaign in 2013 an advertising campaign, littered with red kisses and the slogan "Ich bin Öffi für alles" ("I'm public transport (similar sound as open) for everything" ), was classified as sexist by an advertising watch group.
