= Julian Woods (cricketer) =

Australian cricketer

Personal information
- Born: 4 September 1887; Oatlands, Tasmania, Australia
- Died: 11 October 1975 (aged 88); Lindisfarne, Tasmania, Australia

Domestic team information
- Years: Team
- 1913/14: Tasmania
- Source: Cricinfo, 23 January 2016

Julian Woods (4 September 1887 – 11 October 1975), listed as J. A. Woods, was an Australian cricketer. He played one first-class match for Tasmania 1913/14.

== See also ==
- List of Tasmanian representative cricketers
