= Julian Adrat =

German politician (born 1990)

Member of the Berlin House of Representatives
- Incumbent
- Assumed office 29 October 2026

Personal details
- Born: 1990 (age 35–36)
- Party: Alternative for Germany

Julian Adrat (born 1990) is a German politician who was elected member of the Berlin House of Representatives in 2026. He is a deputy chairman of the Alternative for Germany in Mitte.
