= Julián Güitrón Fuentevilla =

Mexican lawyer and politician

- Occupations: Lawyer and Senator
- Political party: MC

Julián Güitrón Fuentevilla is a Mexican lawyer and politician affiliated with the Convergence. As of 2014 he served as Senator of the LXI Legislature of the Mexican Congress representing the Federal District. He also works as educator in the Department of Law of the National Autonomous University of Mexico.
