= Julian White (Australian footballer) =

Australian rules footballer

Personal information
- Full name: Julian White
- Born: 31 March 1946
- Original team: Mentone
- Height: 179 cm (5 ft 10 in)
- Weight: 71 kg (157 lb)

Playing career^{1}
| Years | Club | Games (Goals) |
| 1965 | St Kilda | 3 (1) |
- ^{1} Playing statistics correct to the end of 1965.

Julian White (born 31 March 1946) is a former Australian rules footballer who played with St Kilda in the Victorian Football League (VFL).
