= Julian Krnjic =

Austrian association football player

Personal information
- Full name: Julian Krnjic
- Date of birth: 19 February 2000 (age 26)
- Place of birth: Austria
- Height: 1.90 m (6 ft 3 in)
- Position: Centre-back

Team information
- Current team: SV Gaissau
- Number: 2

Youth career
- 2006–2020: FC Dornbirn

Senior career*
Years	Team	Apps	(Gls)
2018–2021	FC Dornbirn	10	(0)
2020	→ VfB Hohenems (loan)	0	(0)
2021	→ FC Höchst (loan)	0	(0)
2021–2022	FC Höchst	12	(0)
2022	FC Dornbirn		
2023–2024	SC Hatlerdorf	29	(2)
2025–	SV Gaissau	9	(0)
- * Club domestic league appearances and goals as of 12:01, 4 January 2026 (UTC)

Julian Krnjic (born 19 February 2000) is an Austrian footballer who plays as a centre-back for SV Gaissau.

== Career ==
=== Club career ===
Krnjic is a product of FC Dornbirn 1913. He made his debut for the clubs reserve team on 30 October 2016. On 17 March 2018, Krnjic got his official debut for Dornbirn in the Austrian Regionalliga against Seekirchen. He played four games in the Regionalliga in that season.

In the following two season, Krnjic only played eight games, two of them in the Austrian Football Second League. Therefore, it was confirmed on 22 December 2019, that he would play the rest of the season on loan at VfB Hohenems starting from 1 January 2020. However, due to the COVID-19 pandemic, Krnjic didn't play a single game for Hohenems and returned to Dornbirn in May 2020 where it also was revealed, that Krnjic had to do his conscription from June 2020 and therefore only would play for Dornbirn's reserve team during the period.

In January 2021, Krnjic joined FC Höchst on loan for the rest of the season. Krnjic continued at FC Höchst for the 2021–22 season.

Krnjic retired at the end of 2024. However, he resumed his career in July 2025, when he signed with SV Gaissau.
