= Julian Külpmann =

German drummer (born 1989)

Julian Külpmann (born November 2, 1989) is a German drummer.

== Biography ==
Julian Külpmann was born in Hanover on November 2, 1989. He began playing drums at age 7 and has never stopped every since. After playing many Jazz, Rock and Fusion gigs in his youth, he enrolled at the University of Music Hanover at the age of 16 to study jazz and pop drums while still at school. At the same time he became the drummer of the German Federal Jazz Orchestra (‘Bundesjazzorchester’) and started touring throughout Europe and India. At the age of 19 he continued his jazz studies at the University of the Arts Berlin ('Jazz Institute Berlin') with John Hollenbeck, Kurt Rosenwinkel and Greg Cohen.

Since then Julian has toured an has toured and recorded with dozens of European jazz and pop artists and received numerous awards including Best Young European Musicians 2002 (USA), Skoda Jazz Award 2006 (Germany), Drummer of Tomorrow 2007 (G/A/CH), Future Sounds 2010 (Leverkusener Jazztage) and has even been a semi-finalist at the world-famous Thelonious Monk Jazz Drums Competition 2012 in Washington D.C.

Külpmann founded several own projects, such as his own German jazzband The K Square, releasing the album Blue Desert feat. Nils Wogram and David Friedman in 2013, and the Pop rock project The Innervault. He also played drums for Udo Lindenberg's 'Hinterm Horizont' and is frequently playing drums at the 'Theater des Westens' Berlin for KuDamm 56. Julian is a member of the Ron Spielman Trio (since 2015), Attila Mühl Band, The Airlettes.

Julian endorses Ludwig Drums and Meinl Cymbals. He is currently living in Berlin, where he continues to play and record for artists all over the place in the world of jazz, pop and soul.

== Discography ==
Selective discography:

- Ron Spielman "In a Nutshell" (2021)
- Dino Soldo "Tin Sandwich Smile" (2021)
- Attila Mühl "Lucid Dreamer" (2021)
- Anna Marlene "He Doesn't Want Me Anymore" (2021)
- Ron Spielman "The Rehearsal Sessions" (2019)
- Call Me Cleo "Everything That I Got" (2019)
- Ron Spielman "Tip Of My Tongue" (2018)
- Achim Seifert Project "Versus" (2018)
- The Airlettes "Flying Home for Christmas" (2018)
- Achim Seifert Project "Noticed my heart" (2014)
- The K Square "Blue Desert" (2013)
- Achim Seifert Project "Plans to wake up on the beach" (2011)
- BuJazzO Vol. 10, Mike Herting, "Calcutta Ending" (2011)
- BuJazzO Vol. 9, Mike Herting, "Originals" (2010)
- BuJazzO Vol. 8, Maria Baptist, "City Grooves" (2011)
- BuJazzO Vol. 7, "Next Generation" (2007)
