= Julian Weiskopf =

Austrian footballer

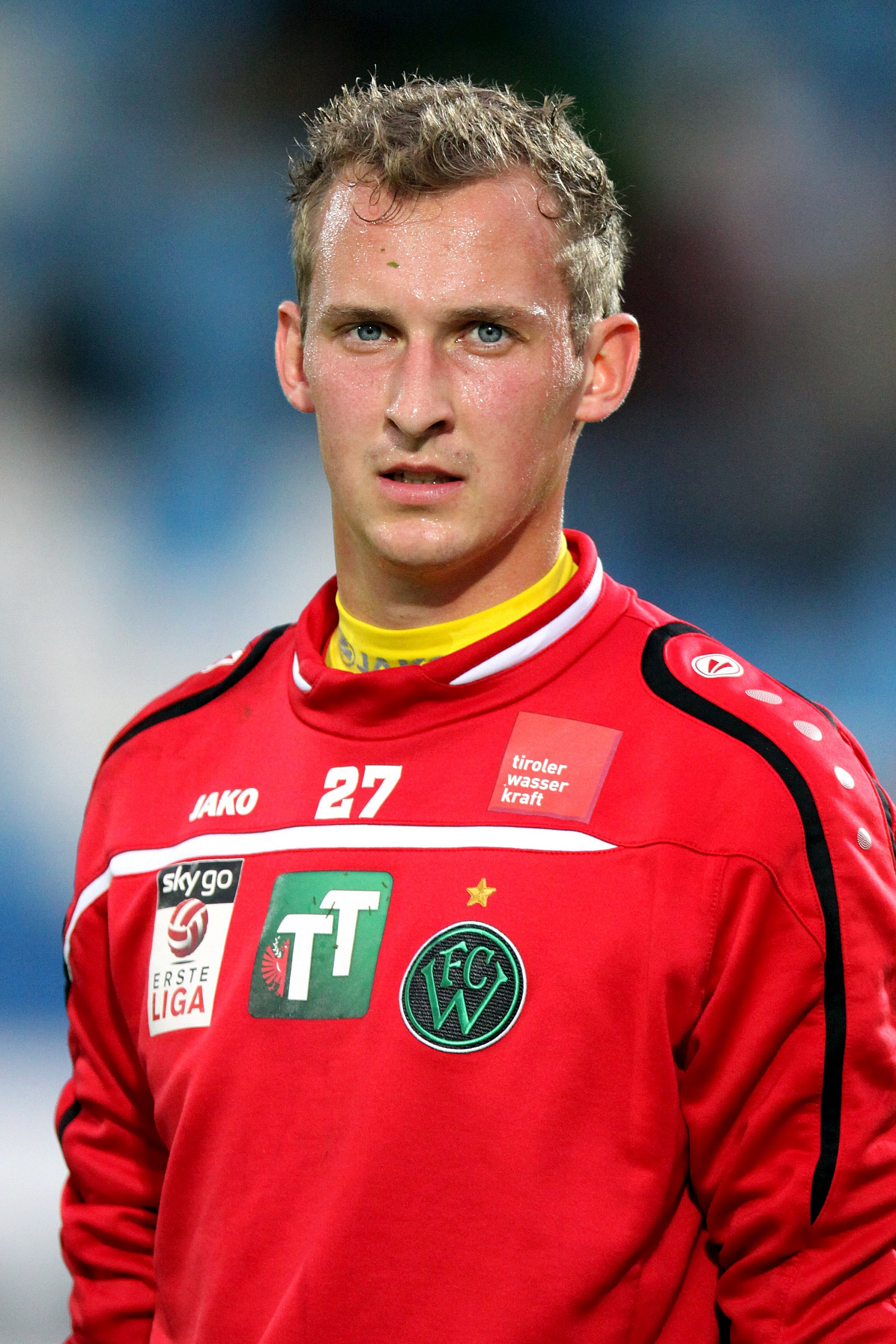
- Julian Weiskopf in 2015.

Personal information
- Date of birth: 20 November 1993 (age 32)
- Place of birth: Austria
- Height: 1.87 m (6 ft 1 1/2 in)
- Position: Goalkeeper

Team information
- Current team: FC Kufstein
- Number: 1

Youth career
- 2001–2010: TSU Prägraten

Senior career*
Years	Team	Apps	(Gls)
2010–2011	TSU Prägraten		
2011–2013	Rapid Lienz	54	(0)
2013–2017	FC Wacker Innsbruck II	28	(0)
2013–2017	FC Wacker Innsbruck	25	(0)
2017–	FC Kufstein	17	(0)
- * Club domestic league appearances and goals as of 26 October 2019

Julian Weiskopf (born 20 November 1993) is an Austrian footballer who plays for FC Kufstein.
