= Julian Wilson =

Julian Wilson may refer to:

- Julian Wilson (American football) (born 1991), American football player
- Julian Wilson (commentator) (1940–2014), English horse racing commentator
- Julian Wilson (surfer) (born 1988), Australian professional surfer
