= Julian Pęski =

Polish surgeon

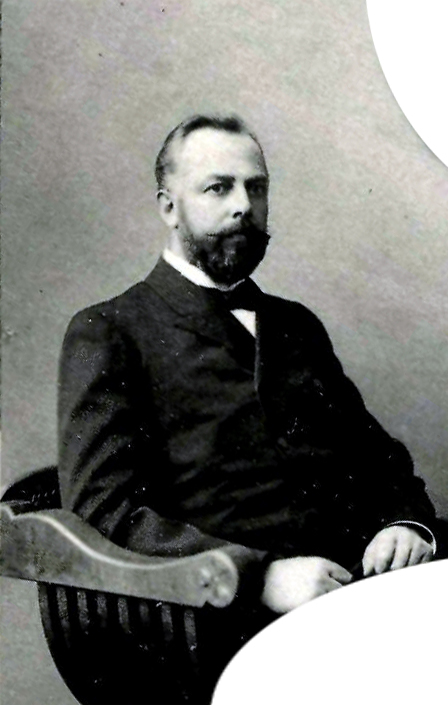
Julian Pęski, chirurg

Julian Pęski (1859–1920) was an ethnic Polish Russian Empire surgeon.
