= Julian Hans =

French rugby union player

Julian Hans (born 20 May 1985) is a retired French rugby player, who played in the full-back position.

He played for Stade Français, USA Limoges and US Colomiers, before retiring due to injury.
