= Julian Piggott =

English cricketer

Major Julian Ito Piggott MC (25 March 1888 – 23 January 1965) was an English first-class cricketer active 1910–13 who played for Surrey and soldier. He was born in Tokyo; died in Dorking. He was an MC in the 1917 Birthday Honours for his service during World War I
