= Julian Samuel =

Canadian documentary filmmaker, writer and painter

- Born: Lahore, Pakistan
- Notable work: Atheism and Save and Burn

Julian Samuel is a Canadian documentary filmmaker, writer and painter. He has produced and directed a number of films that examine the historical and contemporary relationship between the Western world, the Middle East and Asia set against larger subjects in contemporary society. Palestine's struggle for self-determination is a recurring theme in his work. Notable films include Atheism (2006), Save and Burn (2004) and The Library in Crisis (2002). McGill University and University of Toronto have his archive of works.

== Biography ==
Julian Samuel was born in Lahore, Pakistan. His family emigrated to the UK and then to Canada. After graduating from Trent University with a degree in English, he established himself in Montreal from 1979 onwards. Samuel completed an MFA from Concordia University, where he subsequently taught at the graduate level, focusing on aesthetics in documentary filmmaking. He resides in Toronto, Ontario, Canada.

== Career ==
Samuel has made a number of films that examine the historical and contemporary relationship between the West, the Middle East and Asia set against larger subjects in contemporary society. Palestine's struggle for self-determination is a recurring theme in his work among other post-colonial themes.

He is the author of Muskoka (2024) (2018)Radius Islamicus (2018)Passage to Lahore (1995) and Lone Ranger in Pakistan (1986). On the book jacket of Passage to Lahore, Cameron Bailey, artistic director of the Toronto International Film Festival, writes "the bravest piece of writing to emerge from our carefully confused Canada...(T)he book is unafraid of anger, unafraid of ideas and unafraid of speaking the wrong thing."

Passage to Lahore received mixed reviews upon its French release in Quebec. The book contains criticism of the Quebec provincial government's political agenda to preserve Quebecois culture resulting in a muting of minority representation in the arts.

He is a frequent contributor to Serai, a Montreal-based not-for-profit web magazine focused on arts, culture and politics.

Samuel is also an abstract expressionist astronomy painter.

== Bibliography ==
- Muskoka (2024) Guernica Editions
- Radius Islamicus (2018) Guernica Editions
- Passage to Lahore (1995) The Mercury Press
- Lone Ranger in Pakistan (1986) Emergency Press

== Filmography ==
- 2014: Beulah in Lahore and other places
- 2009: Must Exit
- 2006: Atheism
- 2006: Played the role of Aashir in Carolyn Combs' film Acts of Imagination
- 2004: Save and Burn
- 2002: The Library in Crisis
- 1999: Lettres du Caire
- 1996: Into the European Mirror
- 1995: The City of the Dead and World Exhibitions
- 1993: The Raft of the Medusa
- 1984: Resisting the Pharaohs
- 1983: The Long Sleep and Big Goodbye
- 1982: Dictators
- 1979: Black Skin, White Masks
