= Julian Newman =

American basketball player (born 2001)

No. 4 – Bethesda Lion Angels
- Position: Point guard
- League: NCCAA Division I West Region

Personal information
- Born: September 6, 2001 (age 25) Orlando, Florida, U.S.
- Listed height: 5 ft 5 in (1.65 m)
- Listed weight: 140 lb (64 kg)

Career information
- High school: Downey Christian (Orlando, Florida); Prodigy Prep (Orlando, Florida)
- College: Bethesda (2024–present)

Julian Newman (born September 6, 2001) is an American college basketball player for the Bethesda Lion Angels of the National Christian College Athletic Association (NCCAA). He graduated from Prodigy Prep in Orlando, Florida, in 2020. He stands 5 ft 5 in (170 cm), weighs 140 lb (64 kg), and plays the point guard position.

Newman came to attention in 2012 for his viral highlight videos on YouTube, while playing varsity basketball for Downey Christian School in fifth grade. He sparked polarized opinions, with some outlets touting him as a child prodigy and others criticizing the way he was marketed.

== Early life ==
He is of Euro-Puerto Rican, black American, and Jewish descent. At age three, Newman began showing interest in basketball and his father Jamie soon had him play with regulation-size balls and in recreational leagues with older boys. His father trained him rigorously from a young age, with Newman reportedly making 100 free throws, 200 floaters, and 200 jump shots each day at practice.

=== Middle school ===
In the fall of 2012, after initially attending public schools, Newman transferred to Downey Christian School, a small private school in Orlando, Florida, after his father began coaching basketball and teaching history at the school. As a fifth grader, he began playing basketball for the middle school team. But after seeing immediate success, scoring as many as 91 points in a game, he was promoted to the varsity team. His team competed outside the jurisdiction of the Florida High School Athletic Association (FHSAA). An 11-year-old point guard, Newman stood 4 ft 5 in (1.35 m) and weighed 70 lb (32 kg). Despite wearing the smallest available uniform, he had to tighten the shoulders of his jersey with a hair tie and roll the waistband of his shorts to prevent them from falling off. Through his first three starts, he averaged 12.4 points, 11 assists, and 4.3 steals per game. He led Downey Christian to a 21–6 record while leading the state of Florida in assists.

In sixth grade, Newman averaged 17 points per game. On December 19, 2012, Newman featured in an article on high school sports website MaxPreps, titled, "Fifth grader starting for Florida varsity team." A highlight video of Newman posted to YouTube by recruiting website ScoutsFocus went viral, receiving over 3.5 million views. He soon began making national headlines, including in Sports Illustrated and The New York Times, for being a fifth grader playing varsity basketball. Newman made television appearances on Steve Harvey, The Ellen DeGeneres Show, Good Morning America, and other programs. He was also invited to perform at half-time during an Orlando Magic NBA game.

In December 2013, Newman was tabbed "The Best Sixth Grade Basketball Player You've Ever Seen" by The Huffington Post. By that time, he was averaging 13.6 points and 10.5 assists per game. In 2014, he was labeled by the Tampa Bay Times as "the most marketed 12-year-old basketball player in the world". The efforts to market Newman's career were criticized by some media outlets, who compared him to a child star. As a seventh grader in 2015, Newman became the youngest player to record 1,000 career varsity points. He finished the 2014–15 season averaging 19.8 points, 10.2 assists, and 3.2 steals per game. On October 4, 2016, Newman scored 52 points in a highly publicized match-up with top 2020 class recruit Kyree Walker at the MiddleSchoolHoopsTV camp. His highlight video from the game received over 13 million views on YouTube.

=== High school ===
By 2018, when he was a sophomore in high school, Newman had recorded 3,873 total points, surpassing the Florida prep record set by Teddy Dupay in 1998. In the 2018–19 season, he averaged 34.7 points, seven assists, five rebounds, and four steals per game, though Downey Christian finished the year with a 19–26 record.

As Newman entered his final years of high school, evaluators increasingly questioned whether his game would translate to higher levels of competition. At 5-foot-5 and 140-pound, he was undersized relative to Division I guards, and recruiters were reportedly wary of his tendency to shoot on roughly half of his team's offensive possessions, a habit he had carried since middle school. Some of his own Downey Christian teammates attributed friction within the program in part to his shot selection. Newman said he had drawn interest from high-major programs including Florida and Kansas, but coaches from both schools told Bleacher Report they were not recruiting him.

For his senior season, Newman transferred to Prodigy Prep, a new school based in Orlando and created by his father, who also served as head basketball coach.

Despite his scoring totals and national media profile, Newman's college recruitment became a point of public dispute. Some reporting indicated he held NCAA Division I scholarship offers, though none from high-major programs. His father claimed Newman received 15 total Division I offers, while online critics and recruiting analysts widely contended he received none. Newman himself later described more limited interest, saying that during his junior year he had drawn attention from in-state programs including UTSA, USF, and UCF, alongside discussions about playing professionally overseas that ultimately did not materialize.

=== Post-high school ===
After graduating from Prodigy Prep in 2020, Newman did not immediately enroll in college or sign with a professional team, a gap that lasted until he joined Bethesda University in 2024. In the spring of 2020, Newman said in an interview on Overtime's YouTube channel that he intended to forgo college and turn professional overseas. His father and coach, Jamie Newman, said around the same time that Julian had received 15 Division I scholarship offers and was considering the NBA G League or a move to Australia, China, Italy, or Germany; recruiting analysts and other media outlets disputed that he held any Division I offers at all. In a July 2020 Instagram Live appearance, Newman gave a different account, naming Australia, Japan, and Spain as possible destinations.

None of these plans resulted in a signing, and Newman did not play organized basketball at the college, professional, or G League level over the next several years; one retrospective described him as having been "stationary" since finishing high school. During this period he continued informal training with his father's program, Prodigy Prep, in Orlando.

Newman remained active in exhibition and streetball formats. He appeared in televised one-on-one matchups produced by Ballislife, including games against streetball players Hezi God and Trevor Dunbar. On December 21, 2022, he took part in a three-way "King of the Court" matchup against Dunbar and former Baltimore prep standout Aquille Carr, broadcast live by Ballislife.

In early 2023, Newman competed in the third season of Creator League, a basketball competition series featuring internet content creators, partnered with Stephania in a 2v2 tournament format. Their team advanced to the tournament semifinals.

== College career ==
Newman signed with Bethesda University of the National Christian College Athletic Association (NCCAA) in 2024. He made his collegiate debut against The Master's on October 24, going scoreless on 0–6 shooting, all from three point territory, in a 109–23 loss.

Newman returned for a sophomore season in 2025–26, switching from jersey No. 2 to No. 4. Ahead of the season, his father Jamie Newman was hired as Bethesda's head women's basketball coach.

== Personal life ==
Newman is of Puerto Rican descent through his mother and of African American and Jewish descent through his father. His mother, Vivian Gonzalez, played point guard for University High School in Orlando, Florida, before serving four years in the United States Navy and later working for the United States Postal Service. His father, Jamie Newman, was a point guard for Colonial High School in Orlando, Florida, and is now a history teacher as well as the head basketball coach at Downey Christian School. Newman's younger sister, Jaden, began playing varsity basketball for Downey Christian in third grade, drawing national attention and appearing on television programs such as The Queen Latifah Show. She was reportedly recruited by the Miami Hurricanes when she was only nine years old.

In 2015, Newman began starring in his own documentary series, "Born Ready," uploaded by YouTube channel Elite Mixtapes. Newman and his family also feature in the reality show "Hello Newmans," launched by sports network Overtime in 2019 on YouTube, Snapchat, Instagram and Facebook.

Newman is also associated with his family's sports apparel brand Prodigy. Brand merchandise has been sold at his games.

=== Boxing ===
Alongside his basketball career, Newman has competed in several exhibition boxing matches as part of livestreamer Adin Ross's "Brand Risk" crossover boxing event series. He defeated fellow competitor Gio Wise at a Brand Risk event in 2025, after which a post-fight confrontation broke out between Newman and rival streamer Oblivion.

That rivalry led to an official three-round exhibition bout between Newman and Oblivion, headlining Brand Risk 10 in Tennessee on October 3, 2025. Newman won the bout by unanimous decision.
