= Julian Notary =

English printer and bookseller

- Born: 1455
- Died: 1523 (aged 67–68)
- Occupations: Printer, bookseller

Julian Notary (1455–1523) was an English printer and bookseller.

== Career ==
As a printer of books, Notary frequently collaborated with Wynkyn de Worde. He had a French associate named Jean Barbier. In the colophon to his books, he writes that he lived in Kings street near Westminster. His earliest work is dated to 20 December 1498.

Notary was also a bookbinder.

He used the initials of "I.N." as a printers mark on his books.
