= Julian Cubillos =

- Born: Julian Vittorio Cubillos; March 21, 1991 (age 35); Torrance, California
- Genres: Alternative rock; art punk
- Occupations: Singer; songwriter; multi-instrumentalist; producer
- Instruments: Vocals, guitar
- Years active: 2010–present
- Label: Tiny Montgomery
- Website: juliancubillos.com

Julian Vittorio Cubillos (born March 21, 1991) is an American singer, songwriter, producer and multi-instrumentalist.

== Early life ==
Cubillos was born in Torrance, California. He began playing guitar at age 5 and studied jazz and ethnomusicology at Los Angeles County High School for the Arts and UCLA.

== Career ==
In 2013, Cubillos traveled to New York City to participate in the 14th edition of the Red Bull Music Academy.

In 2014, he released his third record, Evil, on New York-based record label Tiny Montgomery.

== Musical style ==
Cubillos' musical style has been described with a wide array of categorizations including "jazzy lo-fi," psychedelic, garage rock, and electropop. His recordings have been described as sounding "terrible."

== Discography ==
=== Studio albums ===
- Youth (2010)
- Grand Prize (2012)
- Evil (2014)

=== Singles ===
- I Explode the Bully with My Mind (2014)
- Bon Courage (w/ Tom Csatari) (2014)
- Scared (2016)

=== Production credits ===
- Outro Waltz by Tom Csatari Band (2015)
- Broken Now by East of Eden (2015)
- BrandCore™ / Escarpments by Uncivilized (2016)
