= Julian Allwood =

British engineer

Julian Allwood FReng
- Born: June 1965 (age 60)
- Occupation: Professor

Julian Mark Allwood (born July 1965) is a British academic known for his work in climate mitigation and metal forming. He is professor of engineering and the environment at the University of Cambridge Department of Engineering and a fellow of the Royal Academy of Engineering.

== Early life and education ==
Allwood was born in July 1965. Allwood graduated in engineering at Corpus Christi College, Cambridge, in 1987 and subsequently received his PhD entitled 'On-line modelling and control of shape phenomena in metal rolling' in 1993 at Imperial College London.

== Career and notable works ==
He worked for 10 years for Alcoa before starting his academic career at Imperial College, moving to Cambridge in 2000. He has developed new metal manufacturing technologies and established an environmental systems and production research group.

He has built several multidisciplinary research groups across several institutions and is currently the principal investigator of UK FIRES and group head of the Use Less Group, based in the Department of Engineering at the University of Cambridge.

He was the creator and director of STEM outreach project, 88 Pianists, in which primary school children were invited to invent mechanisms to allow 88 people to play one piano simultaneously in order to break a world record. A performance using these contraptions took place in August 2019, and video footage went viral.

He is an author of 2012 book Sustainable Materials: with both eyes open, listed by Bill Gates as one of his top six reads of 2015, and the revised edition Sustainable Materials: Without The Hot Air.

Allwood was a lead author of the Intergovernmental Panel on Climate Change's Fifth Assessment Report with a focus on mitigating industrial emissions. He is an Honorary Fellow of the Institute of Materials, Minerals and Mining, a Fellow of the International Academy for Production Engineering (CIRP) and past chairman of its metal forming section, a member of the UK’s Energy Research Partnership.

Allwood’s body of work includes over 140 journal papers, 56 conference papers and hundreds of invited talks.

=== Absolute Zero ===
In 2019, Allwood authored the report 'Absolute Zero' which detailed a roadmap to zero emissions without relying on new technology. 'Absolute Zero' was the subject of a debate in the House of Lords on 6 February 2020.

Part of the UK FIRES grant output, the report works on the basis that the UK must cut greenhouse gas emissions in line with the Climate Change Act, but that current policy relies on technology which will not be upscaled and deployed in time. Of particular note are statements that there is currently no zero emissions way to fly, ship, eat beef and lamb or use cement, and so for some period of time, these activities must cease completely. He has been quoted a number of times in the UK media with further comments on these assertions.

== Awards ==
At the 2021 International Conference on the Technology of Plasticity he was awarded the International Prize for Research & Development in Precision Forging by the Japan Society for Technology of Plasticity.
