= Julián Šimko =

Slovak politician

Julián Šimko (30 November 1886 – 16 March 1956) was the land president of Slovakia in the First Czechoslovak Republic from 1938 to 1939.

== See also ==
- Prime Minister of Slovakia
