= Julian Gardner (art historian) =

British art historian

Julian Richard Gardner (born 6 May 1940) is a British art historian and Professor Emeritus at the University of Warwick. A scholar of late medieval and renaissance Italian art, particularly patronage, and a Giotto di Bondone specialist whose expertise has led to a number of scholarships and appointments as visiting professor at various institutions both in Europe and America.

== Early life and education ==
Born in Dumfries, Scotland to John Vincent and Jessie Lamb (Walker) Gardner and raised in Ebbw Vale, Wales, Julian Gardner read for his undergraduate degree (BA) in history at Balliol College, Oxford, graduating in 1961. He went on to study for a diploma in art history at the Courtauld Institute of Art under the tutelage of many of the great art historians of the time as he described in an interview with Margaret Mullett when he was visiting scholar in Byzantine studies at Dumbarton Oaks in 2014;

The Courtauld under its charismatic director Anthony Blunt was an exciting place, and there were many eminent emigré scholars who taught there and at the University of London: George Zarnecki, Nikolaus Pevsner, and, at the Warburg, Hugo Buchthal, Ernst Gombrich, and others. Younger English scholars, such as John Shearman and Michael Baxandall, were also making names for themselves.

A Rivoira fellowship in medieval archaeology at the British School at Rome followed in the academic year 1965-6 earning him an MA from the University of Oxford in 1966. He returned to the Courtauld and undertook a PhD; The Influence of Popes’ and Cardinals’ Patronage on the Introduction of the Gothic Style into Rome and the Surrounding Areas, 1254-1305 which Richard Krautheimer has described as ‘the best work in existence on the patronage of Italian art in the Duecento.’

== Career ==
Concurrently with working on his doctoral thesis at the University of London, Julian Gardner taught at the Courtauld and lectured there for 8 years until his appointment as Foundation Professor of the History of Art at Warwick University in 1974; a post he remained in until his retirement in 2008. In 2014 he was appointed an Honorary Professor in the Centre for the Study of the Renaissance.

Julian Gardner met and came to know the art historian Ernst Kitzinger when the latter retired to Oxford. He was partly responsible for the granting of an honorary degree (D. Litt) to Kitzinger by Warwick University in 1989 to which institute he donated papers on his death. Professor Gardner penned the obituary for Ernst Kitzinger that was published in The Independent in 2003.

He was also the author of the obituary for Professor John Shearman in 2013.

In a review of his most recent book The Roman Crucible, the author concludes that "Gardner's book fills an important gap in late medieval patronage studies, and with its historical rigor and measured argumentation it is likely to remain the standard work on the topic for decades to come".

=== Scholarships, appointments, and honours ===
- Fellow of the Society of Antiquaries elected 3 March 1977
- Research Professor of the Max-Planck-Gesellschaft at the Bibliotheca Hertziana in Rome 1983-5
- Andrew Mellon Senior Visiting Fellow at the Centre for Advanced Study in the Visual Arts (CASVA) at the National Gallery of Art, Washington DC. 1999
- Distinguished Visiting Professor in Mediaeval Studies at the University of California, Berkeley 2000
- Visiting Professor, 2005–2006 and Berenson Lecturer, 2009 at Harvard University Centre for Renaissance Studies at Villa I Tatti, Florence
- Samuel H. Kress Professor, National Gallery of Art, Washington DC. 2011–2012
- Visiting scholar in Byzantine studies, Dumbarton Oaks 2014
- A festschrift in his honour was presented to him and published in 2011.

==== Other ====
Julian Gardner joined the editorial consultative committee of the Burlington Magazine in 1975 and serves, or has served, as a National Committee Member of the Comité Internationale d'Histoire de l'Art, the Institut National d'Histoire de l'Art in Paris, the Association of Art Historians (AAH) and was a member of the Curatorium of the Kunsthistorisches Institut, Florence from 1993 to 2003.

Gardner has delivered paper(s) to the Giotto Circle at the Courtauld Institute of Arts which promotes the study of the art and architecture of Italy in the thirteenth and fourteenth centuries and, while he worked at the Courtauld, he contributed photographs to the Conway Library whose archive of primarily architectural images is currently being digitised as part of the Courtauld Connects project.

== Personal life ==
Julian Gardner was married to Ann Margaret Stoves who died in 1968. His second wife, they married in 1973, and fellow art historian, Dr Christa Gardner von Teuffe is based at Warwick University and is a specialist in Italian religious art.

== Selected works ==
- The most important early Italian painting in England? ‘Life:Full Colour’, Online blog by Sara McKee, 2020
- The Roman Crucible: the artistic patronage of the Papacy 1198-1304, München: Hirmer Verlag, 2013, ISBN 9783777423852
- Giotto and His Publics: Three Paradigms of Patronage, 'The Bernard Berenson Lectures on the Italian Renaissance' series, Cambridge, Mass. & London: Harvard University Press, 2011, ISBN 0674050800
- Arnolfo's Moment: Acts of an International Conference, Florence, Villa I Tatti, May 26-7, 2005, eds. David Friedman, Julian Gardner & Margaret Haines, L.S. Olschki, 2009, ISBN 8822258207
- Giotto in America (and elsewhere), in ‘Italian Panel Painting of the Dugento and Trecento’, ed. V.M. Schmidt, Studies in the History of Art, Yale University Press, vol.61, pp. 160–81, 2002
- Patrons, Painters, and Saints: Studies in Medieval Italian Painting, Brookfield, VT: Variorum, 1993, ISBN 0860783790
- The Tomb and the Tiara: Curial Tomb Sculpture in Rome and Avignon in the Later Middle Ages, Clarendon, 1992, ISBN 0198175108
