= Julian Bagley =

American author and concierge

Julian Elihu Bagley (December 10, 1892 – October 17, 1981) was an American author, World War I veteran, and concierge. In 1922, he moved to San Francisco in hopes of opening a waterfront hotel. He was a well-known concierge at the San Francisco War Memorial Opera House where he worked for 39 years, starting on opening night on October 15, 1932. During this time, Bagley wrote a children's book called Candle-lighting Time in Bodidalee, which was a book filled with animal folklore.

== Early life ==
Bagley served in the Army during World War I and later earned a degree in agriculture from Hampton Institute.

== Career ==
In 1922, Bagley moved to San Francisco in hopes of opening a waterfront hotel. Instead, he ended up working at the San Francisco War Memorial Opera House. He worked there for 39 years beginning on opening night on October 15, 1932. While he served as a concierge, Bagley wrote his first book called Welcome to the San Francisco Opera House in 1923. He also wrote for The Crisis magazine under the editorship of W. E. B. Du Bois from 1910 to 1923. During this time, Bagley wrote three different stories for the Crisis, and out of those three, Vagabonding in a City of Opera Seats, was nominated as an honorable mention for the magazine's contest. He spent much of his time writing short stories for the Crisis focusing specifically on issues of that time including racism and education for blacks. These themes can be seen in his short story "Niggers". Bagley also wrote for other publications, including New Outlook. He also contributed stories for The Brownies' Book.

On January 1, 1971, Bagley wrote a book called Candle-lighting Time in Bodidalee. Wallace Tripp illustrated the book alongside Bagley. Tripp has illustrated over 40 children books and is also one of the illustrators of Amelia Bedelia. Candle-lighting Time in Bodidalee is a book based on animal folklore from Africa. There are 18 stories and Uncle Remus writes about Br'er Rabbit, Br'er Fox, and Br'er Bear in one of the stories.

== Selected writings ==
=== Further reading ===
Bagley wrote short stories for the Crisis including:

- Niggers
- Children of Chance
- Vagabonding in a City of Opera Seats

He also wrote a short story in The Southern Workman called:

- Saving the Situation
