= Julian Colombo =

Argentine politician

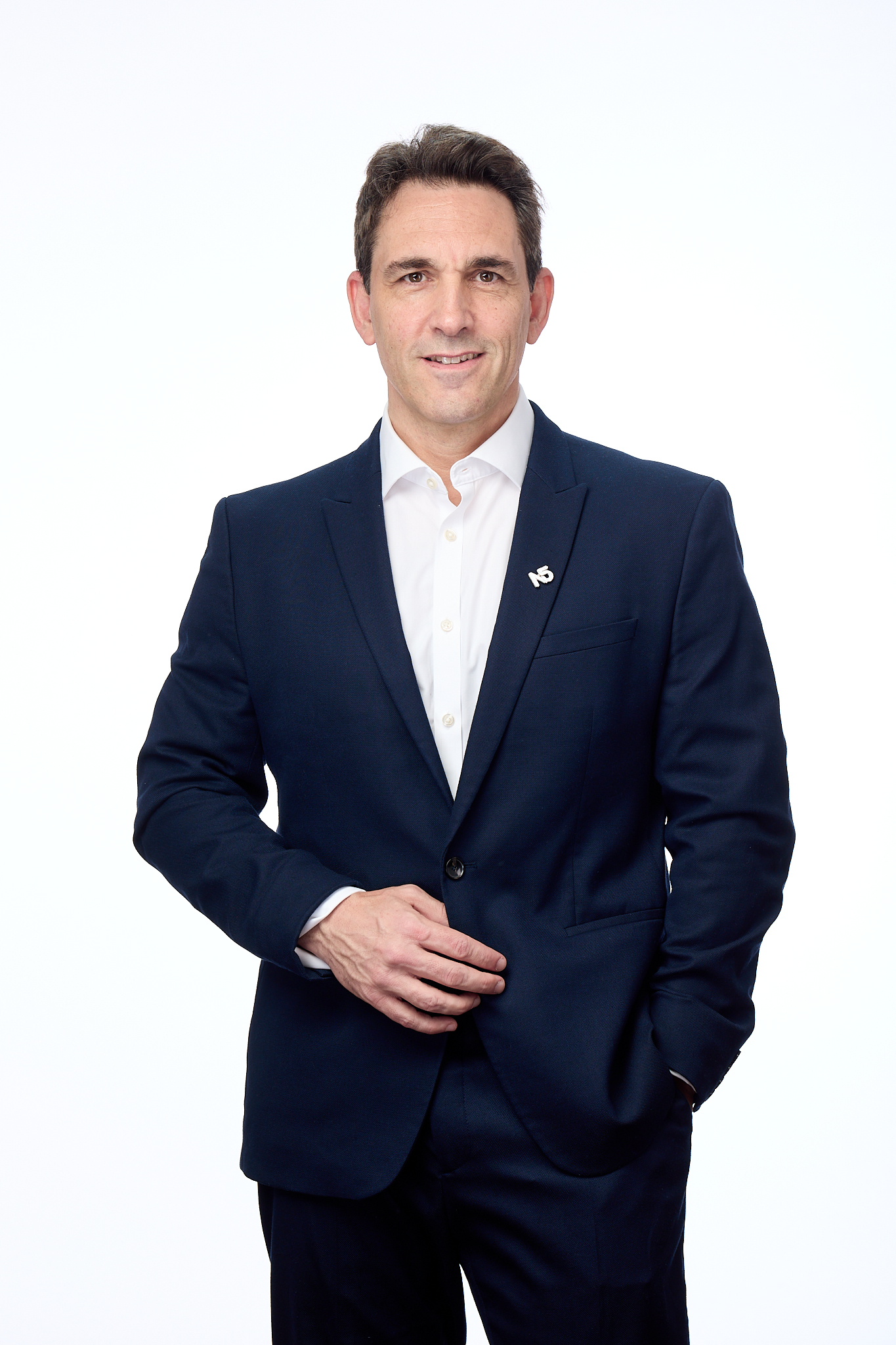
Julian Colombo

Julian Colombo is an Argentine politician, serving as a member of parliament in Argentina from 2015 to 2019.

== Education ==
From 1991 to 1996, Colombo earned a Bachelor of Science (B.S.) in Economics from Pontificia Universidad Católica Argentina 'Santa María de los Buenos Aires', where he founded the Ucanomics magazine. Between 1993 and 1995, he also completed a Bachelor of Arts (B.A.) in Journalism at the same university. Later, he also attended Harvard Business School, focusing on Sales, Distribution, and Marketing Operations.

== Career ==
Colombo began his career in January 1998 as a Sales Representative at Internet Securities in Argentina, a role he held until December 1998. From November 1998 to August 2002, he worked as Savings and Deposits Product Manager at Banco Santander Rio in Argentina.

In August 2002, Colombo joined Banco Santander Mexico as Mass Affluent Customers Segment Manager, a position he held until August 2004. He then moved to Santander Brasil, serving as Commercial Strategy Director from August 2004 to December 2006, where he oversaw incentives, commercial tools, sales forecasts, marketing campaigns, and business intelligence strategies.

From December 2006 to May 2011, he served as Latam personal banking director at Grupo Santander in Madrid, Spain, where he was responsible for strategic direction, market growth, and profitability of the personal banking segment across eight Latin American countries.

Between April 2011 and April 2014, Colombo was director of personal and SMB banking, BI, and CRM at Banco Santander Chile, leading business intelligence, CRM initiatives, and retail customer strategy. From April 2014 to September 2017, he served as Global Managing Director of CRM & Business Intelligence at Banco Santander in Madrid, focusing on digital transformation and commercial tools. In September 2017, Julian Colombo became the CEO of N5 Now, that was elected one of the 10 forbes promises for 2024.
