= Julian Troy =

Australian rugby league footballer

Personal information
- Full name: Julian Demonde Troy
- Born: 21 March 1972 (age 52)

Playing information
- Position: Prop
Club
Years	Team	Pld	T	G	FG	P
1996–97	Eastern Suburbs	17	0	0	0	0
1998	Parramatta Eels	9	1	0	0	4
	Total	26	1	0	0	4

Julian Troy is an Australian former professional rugby league footballer who played for the Eastern Suburbs Roosters later renamed Sydney Roosters and the Parramatta Eels as a prop.

== Playing career ==
Troy made his debut for Eastern Suburbs in Round 21 of the 1996 season against the Cronulla-Sutherland Sharks. Troy featured in the 1996 finals series for Easts but the club bowed out in straight sets losing both games. In 1998, Troy joined Parramatta and played one season with them featuring in nine games.

== Post playing ==
After his playing career finished, Troy became a practicing lawyer and then moved to Darwin. In 2012, Troy was given a 18-month suspended jail sentence after bashing a patron at a pub in Darwin. It was reported that Troy was asked by staff not to drink outside the venue. An argument then broke out between Troy and another man, the man punched Troy who hit him back causing the person to hit their head on the pavement. Troy then knelt over the victim and punched him four times in the face before kicking him in the head. The man suffered a fractured cheek bone, broken nose, lost four teeth and needed stitches, as well as bone and skin grafts. It was reported that Troy's lawyer told the Northern Territory Supreme Court that it was unlikely Troy would be able to practice law again after the incident.
