= Julian Cassell =

English cricketer (born 1967)

Personal information
- Born: 24 October 1967 (age 59); Salisbury, Wiltshire, England
- Batting: Right-handed
- Bowling: Right-arm medium

Domestic team information
- Years: Team
- 1993–1998: Dorset

Career statistics
Competition	LA
Matches	3
Runs scored	29
Batting average	14.50
100s/50s	–/–
Top score	24
Balls bowled	–
Wickets	–
Bowling average	–
5 wickets in innings	–
10 wickets in match	–
Best bowling	–
Catches/stumpings	–/–
- Source: Cricinfo, 23 March 2010

Julian Cassell (born 24 October 1967) is a former English cricketer. Cassell was a right-handed batsman who bowled right-arm medium pace.

Cassell made his debut for Dorset in the 1990 Minor Counties Championship against Herefordshire. He represented Dorset in 44 Minor Counties Championship matches from 1993 to 1998, with his final Minor Counties match for Dorset coming against Devon.

In 1995, he made his List-A debut for Dorset against Glamorgan in the 1st round of the 1995 NatWest Trophy. Cassell represented Dorset in one further List-A match, against Scotland in the 1st round of the 1999 NatWest Trophy.
