= Julian Gonsalves =

Indian environmentalist

- Born: Benaulim, Goa, India
- Education: Cornell University (Ph.D.)
- Occupations: Agronomist; environmentalist
- Title: Vice president of IIRR
- Awards: Global 500 Roll of Honour (1991)

Julian Gonsalves is an Indian agronomist and environmentalist based in the Philippines, best known for proposing, field-testing, and developing the participatory workshop process for documenting best practices, now considered one of the more innovative services provided by IIRR. During his stint at the IIRR, he has been heading its appropriate technology unit and was also later the IIRR's vice president for programs.

== Personal life and education ==
Gonslaves is originally from the region of Benaulim, Goa, in western India. He received a PhD in sustainable agriculture from the Cornell University. has served as the vice-president of the International Institute for Rural Reconstruction, based in the Philippines.

== Career ==
Gonsalves is known for his work in the field of international rural and agricultural development, and is an awardee of the Sustainable Agriculture and Rural Development Award from Germany, bestowed on him in 1997.

He has also worked as a research associate at the University of Dar es Salaam, and has organised training, communication, extension, and teaching posts in India. He served on the NGO Committee of the CGIAR.

== Awards ==
Gonsalves won the Global 500 Roll of Honour award from the United Nations Environment Programme in 1991.
