= Julian Adyeri Omalla =

Ugandan businesswoman and entrepreneur

- Born: 1965 (age 60–61); Uganda
- Other names: Mama Cheers
- Occupations: Businesswoman, Entrepreneur
- Known for: Founder and Managing Director of Delight Uganda Limited
- Notable work: Expansion of fruit juice industry in Uganda
- Awards: UNCTAD Empretec Women in Business Award (Special Prize)

Julian Adyeri Omalla alias "Mama Cheers" (born 1965) is a Ugandan businesswoman and an entrepreneur. She is the founder and managing director of Delight Uganda Limited.

== Early life and career ==
Julian Omalla was born in 1965, and raised in Uganda. She started her career life as businesswoman and entrepreneur in 1996, despite her limited knowledge about running a business. Headquartered in a suburb of Kampala, she started a logistics and taxi service business with an initial $100 investment. She had an early setback when a business partner stole money from her. She then turned to fruit juice manufacturing, launching the Cheers fruit juice brand by importing pulp from South Africa, Israel, and France.

In 2000, she received support from the United Nations program EMPRETEC, where she learned entrepreneurial skills which helped her grow her business. She participated in UNCTAD's entrepreneurship program which help her in formulating and implementing a business expansion strategy such as goal establishment, financial record-keeping, marketing tactics, target setting, and effective task accomplishment.

She was unable to obtain a loan in 2007, which was not unusual for Ugandan women who while owning nearly 40 percent of registered businesses, received less than 10 percent of commercial credit. She was finally able to access credit from the DFCU Bank and the World Bank's private sector arm of the IFC. She was then able to expand her operations to include three farms cultivating fruits and a fleet of 36 trucks. Securing enterprise grants from government agencies, including support from the Business Uganda Development Scheme, allowed her to further expand. In 2013, her company, Delight, announced plans to develop a 5,000-acre site in northern Uganda—an area recovering from prolonged conflict. She identified corruption as one of the key challenges facing businesses in Uganda.

In addition to fruit juice, her business is also involved in poultry farming, drinking water, and a bakery that she started in South Sudan when she realized the demand for bread was not being filled. In 2016 Omalla decided her company would no longer do business in South Sudan because of the property loss she incurred due to looting in the area. In 2021 the Ugandan Government awarded her company, Delight Uganda Limited, a $4 million grant to construct a fresh juice factory in Northern Uganda and a $6 million allocation to procure equipment, with 50% of the funds to be repaid in 10 years (2021)

== Awards and honours ==
- Fellowship to participate in an executive education programme by the International Institute for Management Development in Lausanne, Switzerland.
- Named one of two entrepreneurs of the year in Uganda by the Ernst & Young (2014)
- Special prize during the seventh edition of UNCTAD's Empretec Women in Business Awards (2020)
