= Julian Turner =

British poet and mental health worker (born 1955)

- Born: 1955 (age 69–70); Cheadle Hulme, Stockport, England
- Occupation: Poet, mental health worker
- Education: New College, Oxford; Goldsmiths College, University of London
- Genre: Poetry

Julian Turner (born 1955) is a British poet and mental health worker. Turner was born in Cheadle Hulme, Stockport, then moved to Cheshire in 1955. He now lives in Otley, Leeds, West Yorkshire, with his partner and their daughter.

He was educated at New College, Oxford (matriculated 1974) and Goldsmiths College, University of London.

Turner was the Chief Executive of Leeds Mind until autumn 2010.

His poems have been published in periodicals including Poetry London, The Reater, and The Realto, and in The Ring of Words: Poems from the Daily Telegraph Arvon International Poetry Competition 1998 (introduction by Andrew Motion, Stroud: Sutton, 1998)

In 1993, he won First Prize in the Nortwords poetry competition for his poem Whale Bone.

In 2002, his collection Crossing the Outskirts was published by Anvil Press Poetry. It was a Poetry Book Society Recommendation (2002) and was shortlisted for the Forward Poetry Prize (Best First Collection) (2002). A number of poems in the collection deal with mental health issues. For example, 'Tennis Ball' is about suicide and 'The Director's Cut' is about self-harm. The poems in this collection observe traditional conventions of rhyme and metre.

In 2004, he won a Bridport Supplementary Prize for his poem 'The Gas Poker'.

His second collection, Orphan Sites, was published by Anvil Press Poetry in 2006.

He was anthologised in Bloodaxe's Identity Parade (New British and Irish Poets), edited by Roddy Lumsden, in 2010

His third collection, Planet-Struck was published by Anvil in January 2011 and was also a Poetry Book Society recommendation.

== Sources ==
- Anvil Press Poetry
- Limelight Issue 2 (August 2003)
- EnCompassCulture
- Belinda Cooke, Two from Anvil (Review of Ruth Silcock, Biographies etc. and Julian Turner, Orphan Sites), Stride Magazine (February 2007)
- Jeffrey Side, Review of Julian Turner, Crossing the Outskirts, Stride Magazine (March 2005)
- Peter Dale, ed., Oxford poetry, Oxford Today: The University Magazine vol. 19, no. 2 (Hilary Term 2007), p. 41
- Julian Turner, 'What is Recovery?' (p. 11), 'Opinion' (p. 12) in Leeds Mind Newsletter
- Survivors' Poetry Newsletter no. 1 (September/October 1998), p. 4
- Poetry Express (Winter 2002/03)
- Art at Leeds Mind
- Julian Turner, Memorandum from Leeds Mind, House of Lords-House of Commons Joint Committee on the Draft Mental Health Bill, Session 2004–05, Volume III: Written evidence, pp. 150–151
