= Julian Jansen =

Dutch Professional Football player

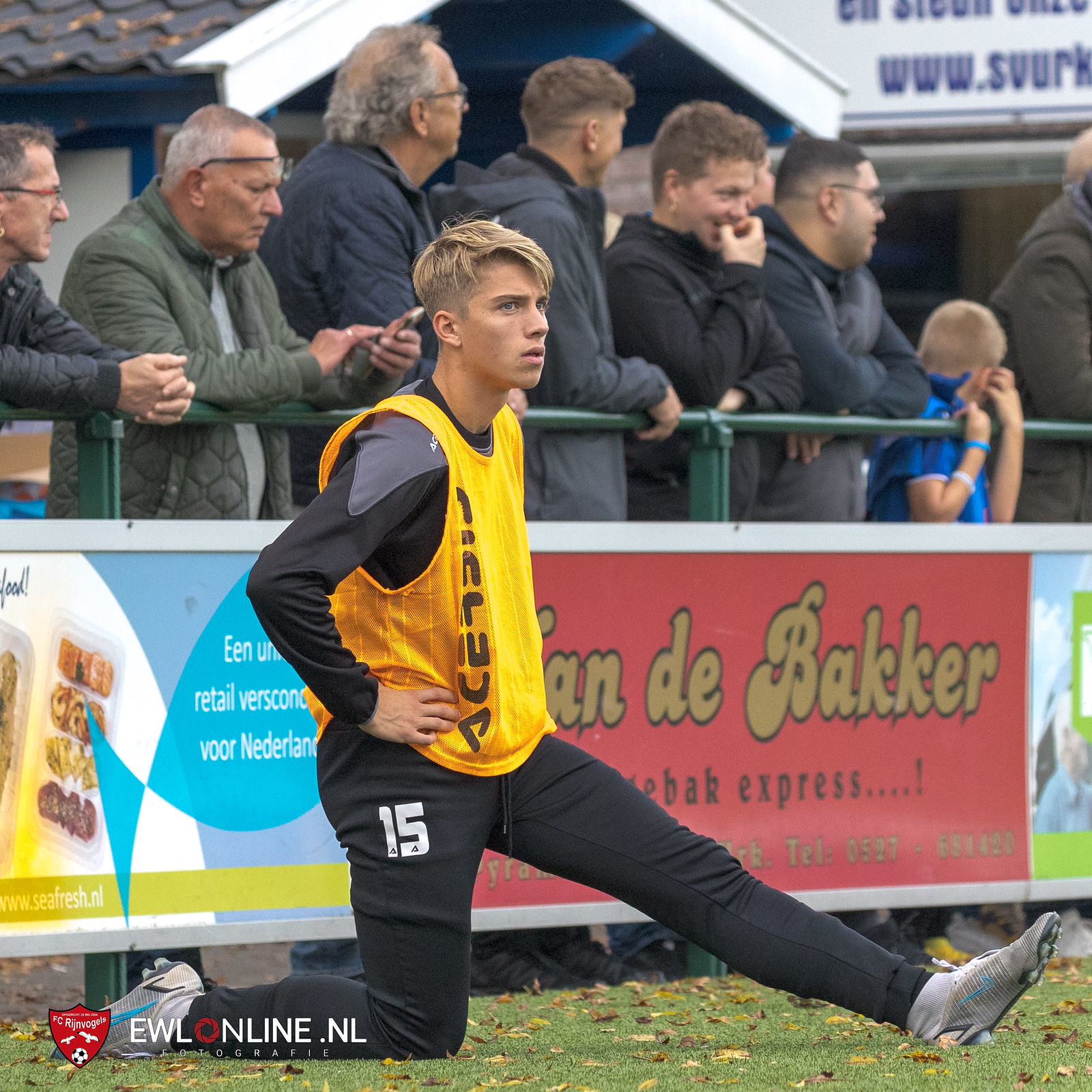

Personal information
- Full name: Julian Jansen
- Date of birth: 12 November 2002 (age 23)
- Place of birth: Guildford, England
- Height: 1.79 m (5 ft 10 in)
- Position: Left back

Team information
- Current team: FC Rijnvogels
- Number: 15

Youth career
- 2019-2020: Bolton Wanderers u18
- 2020-2021: HBS Craeyenhout u19
- 2022-2022: Huddersfield Town u23

Senior career*
Years	Team	Apps	(Gls)
2021-2022	Sancataldese Calcio	4	(0)
2022-2022	St Helens Town (loan)	4	(0)
2022-	FC Rijnvogels	28	(1)
Total		36	(1)
- * Club domestic league appearances and goals

Julian Jansen (born 12 November 2002) is a Dutch Footballer who plays for Derde Divisie club FC Rijnvogels

== Club career ==
Jansen started his Football career playing for Bolton Wanderers u18 in 2019, later moving to Dutch side HBS Craeyenhout u19. Jansen signed his first professional contract with Serie D side Sancataldese Calcio, making his full league debut on the 26th of September 2021 against Real Agro Aversa.

In January 2022 Jansen was playing for Huddersfield Town u23 and signed on loan for St Helens Town where he played for the remainder of the season.

On the 14th of October 2022 Jansen joined FC Rijnvogels, making his debut on the 15th of October against Staphorst.
