= Julián Ezequiel Reynoso =

Mexican politician

- Born: 5 September 1952 (age 73); Monterrey, Nuevo León, Mexico
- Education: UANL
- Occupation: Politician
- Political party: PT

Julián Ezequiel Reynoso Esparza (born 5 September 1952) is a Mexican politician from the Labor Party. From 2008 to 2009 he served as Deputy of the LX Legislature of the Mexican Congress representing Sinaloa, and previously served in the Congress of Sinaloa.
