= Julian Preidl =

German politician (born 1995)

Member of the Landtag of Bavaria
- Incumbent
- Assumed office 30 October 2023
- Constituency: Upper Palatinate

Personal details
- Born: 28 February 1995 (age 31)
- Party: Free Voters of Bavaria (since 2019)

Julian Preidl (born 28 February 1995) is a German politician serving as a member of the Landtag of Bavaria since 2023. He has served as chairman of the youth wing of the Free Voters of Bavaria since 2024.
