= Julián de Leyva =

Argentine politician

Julián de Leyva (1749–1818) was an Argentine politician. He studied at the Royal College of San Carlos and the Royal University of San Felipe in Santiago, Chile.

He held several public offices in the Real Audiencia of Buenos Aires, in the council of that city and in Lujan. He became interested in the conservation and history of Argentina primitive literature, and formed a great library for this purpose.
