= Julián de Olivares =

Spanish fencer

Personal information
- Born: 10 December 1895
- Died: 23 October 1977 (aged 81)

Sport
- Sport: Fencing

Julián de Olivares (10 December 1895 – 23 October 1977) was a Spanish fencer. He competed in the individual and team sabre events at the 1924 Summer Olympics.
