= Julian Thompson (cricketer) =

South African/English cricketer and physician

Julian Barton de Courcy Thompson is a former cricketer, and also a medical doctor. Born in Cape Town in 1968, Thompson first qualified as a doctor before, at the age of 25, embarking on a career in county cricket with Kent County Cricket Club.

"It causes some amusement in the dressing- room with the boys. I get 'Doc, can you fix my ankle' and 'give me some pills, Doc' all the time.'"

In his cricketing career, Thompson took 122 first-class wickets, as a right arm medium fast bowler, with a best of 7-89 and an average of 25.43. With the bat, he made two first-class fifties, with a high score of 65 not out, and averaged 18.82.

He was named Kent's player of the year for 1999, but wasn't able to appear at all in the 2000 season, due to knee injury and after two operations retired as a cricketer in 2001.

As a doctor, Thompson trained at Guy's Hospital. He is a partner in a medical practice in Canterbury.
