= Juliana =

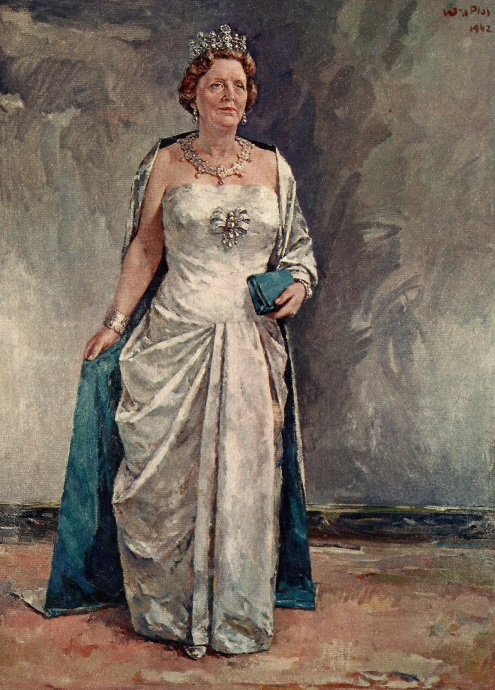
- Queen Juliana was a Dutch princess and queen of the Netherlands.
- Pronunciation: jūl-îanná
- Gender: Female

Origin
- Origin: from Latin
- Meaning: "youthful"
- Region of origin: Mediterranean Europe

Other names
- Nicknames: Juli, Julie, Judy, Jules etc.
- Related names: Julianus, Julian, Julia, Julio, Julius, Julien, Julie, Judy

Juliana (variants Julijana, Julianna, Giuliana, Iuliana, Julliana, Yuliana, etc) is a feminine given name which is the feminine version of the Roman name Julianus. Juliana or Giuliana was the name of a number of early saints, notably Saint Julian the Hospitaller, which ensured the name's continued popularity in the medieval period.

== People with the given name Juliana ==
=== Medieval ===
Ordered chronologically

- Julianna of Paul and Juliana (died 270), Christian martyr during the Aurelian persecution
- St. Juliana of Nicomedia (died 304), Christian martyr during the Diocletian persecution
- St. Juliana (fl. 304, a martyr associated with the legend of Saint Cucuphas
- Juliana Grenier (died between 1213 and 1216)
- St. Juliana of Liège (1193–1252), nun and visionary from Retinnes in Fléron in the Bishopric of Liège, now in Belgium
- St. Juliana Falconieri (1270–1341), Italian foundress of the Servite Third Order
- Juliana or Julian of Norwich (1342–1416), English anchoress, Christian mystic and theologian
- Juliana Holszanska (1375–1448), third wife of Vytautas the Great, Grand Duke of Lithuania
- Juliana Berners (1388–?), English writer on heraldry, hawking and hunting, said to have been a prioress

=== Early modern ===
Ordered chronologically

- Juliana of Stolberg (1506–1580), German noble, mother of William the Silent
- St. Juliana Olshanskaya (c. 1525 – c. 1540)
- Juliana of Lazarevo (1530–1604), saint of the Orthodox Church
- Juliana (fl. 1542), Guaraní woman from early-colonial Paraguay, known for killing her Spanish master and urging other indigenous women to do the same
- Juliana Morell (1594–1653), Spanish Dominican nun and the first woman to receive a Doctor of Laws degree
- Juliana of Hesse-Darmstadt (1606–1659), wife of Count Ulrich II of East Frisia
- Juliana of Hesse-Eschwege (1652–1693), German noble
- Juliana Schierberg (died 1712), Swedish chambermaid and confidante of Princess Hedvig Sophia of Sweden
- Juliana Dias da Costa (1658–1733), Christian woman of Portuguese descent who was influential in the court of the Mughal Empire
- Juliana Annesley, Countess of Anglesey (died 1777)
- Juliana Maria of Brunswick-Wolfenbüttel (1729–1796), queen of Denmark between 1752 and 1766
- Juliana de Lannoy (1738–1782), Dutch artist and poet

=== Modern ===
Ordered alphabetically by last name

- Juliana of the Netherlands (1909–2004), queen regnant of the Kingdom of the Netherlands
- Juliana Addison (born 1974), Australian politician
- Juliana de Almeida e Oyenhausen (1782–1864), Portuguese noble and lady-in-waiting
- Juliana Alves (born 1982), Brazilian actress
- Juliana Areias (born 1975), Brazilian singer-songwriter
- Juliana Modesta Auma (born 1964), Ugandan politician
- Juliana Awada (born 1974), Argentine businesswoman and first lady
- Juliana Azumah-Mensah (born 1950), Ghanaian politician and former Minister for Women and Children's Affairs
- Juliana Baroni (born 1978), Brazilian actress
- Juliana Borges (born 1977), Brazilian jiu-jitsu practitioner
- Juliana Brizola (born 1975), Brazilian lawyer and politician
- Juliana Buhring (born 1981), British-German cyclist and writer
- Juliana Cabral (born 1981), Brazilian footballer
- Juliana Cambré (1914–1990), Dutch jazz trumpeter known as Juultje Cambré
- Juliana Campos (born 1996), Brazilian pole vaulter
- Juliana Canfield (born 1992), American actress
- Juliana Cannarozzo (born 1989), American figure skater and actress
- Juliana Cardoso (born 1979), Brazilian activist and politician
- Juliana Carneiro da Cunha (born 1949), Brazilian actress and ballet dancer
- Juliana Castro (footballer) (born 1991), Uruguayan footballer
- Juliana Cerqueira Leite (born 1981), Brazilian sculptor
- Juliana Chan, multiple people
- Juliana Chen, Chinese-Canadian magician
- Juliana Cherera (born 1976), Kenyan executive
- Juliana Coradine, Brazilian rhythmic gymnast and coach
- Juliana Cunha (born 1987), Brazilian journalist, writer, researcher and university professor
- Juliana Deguis (born 1984), Haitian-Dominican woman
- Juliana Delgado Lopera (born 1988), Colombian writer and performer
- Juliana Dever (born 1980), American actress
- Juliana Devoy (1937–2020), American-born Catholic nun, missionary and social activist
- Juliana Di Tullio (born 1971), Argentine psychologist and politician
- Juliana Didone (born 1984), Brazilian actress
- Juliana Dogbadzi, Ghanaian human rights activist
- Juliana Donald (born 1964), American actress
- Juliana Esteves dos Santos (born 1984), Brazilian rugby union player
- Juliana Evans (born 1989), Malaysian actress
- Juliana Horatia Ewing (1841–1885), English children's writer
- Juliana Felisberta (born 1983), Brazilian beach volleyball player
- Juliana R. Force (1876–1948), American museum administrator and director
- Juliana Francis, American playwright and actress
- Juliana Freire, Brazilian computer scientist
- Juliana Furtado (born 1967), American mountain biker
- Juliana Gattas (born 1978), Argentine singer
- Juliana Gaviria (born 1991), Colombian cyclist
- Juliana González Valenzuela (born 1936), Mexican philosopher
- Juliana Gromova (1924–1943), Ukrainian Soviet World War II anti-Nazi resistance member
- Juliana Habib (born 2000), Colombian beauty pageant titleholder
- Juliana Hall (born 1958), American composer
- Juliana Harkavy (born 1985), American actress
- Juliana Hatfield (born 1967), American actress and guitarist/songwriter
- Juliana Hodkinson (born 1971), British composer
- Juliana Huxtable (born 1987), American artist, writer, performer, and DJ
- Juliana Rae Ibay, Filipina youth leader, politician and actress
- Juliana Jendo (born 1952), Assyrian singer
- Juliana Jirousová (1943–2023), Czechoslovak painter
- Juliana Kaduya (born 1979), Malawian politician
- Juliana Kagwa, Ugandan business executive
- Juliana Kakraba (born 1979), Ghanaian footballer
- Juliana Kanyomozi (born 1981), Ugandan pop musician
- Juliana Klarisa (born 2002), Indonesian weightlifter
- Juliana Knust (born 1981), Brazilian actress
- Juliana Young Koo (1905–2017), Chinese-American diplomat
- Juliana Laffitte (born 1974), Argentine artist
- Juliana Larena y Fenollé (1790–1835), Spanish nurse
- Juliana Latifi, Albanian professor and judge
- Juliana Lima (born 1982), Brazilian mixed martial artist
- Juliana Emma Linter (1844–1909), British conchologist and collector
- Juliana Lohmann (born 1989), Brazilian actress
- Juliana Londoño (born 2005), Colombian cyclist
- Juliana Luecking, American musician and video maker
- Juliana Lunguzi (born 1971), Malawian politician
- Juliana Machado (born 1994), Angolan handball player
- Juliana Machado Ferreira (born 1980), Brazilian conservation geneticist and activist
- Juliana Malacarne (born 1974), Brazilian bodybuilder
- Juliana Mansvelt, New Zealand social geographer
- Juliana Aidén Martinez (born 1990), American actress
- Juliana Martins, multiple people
- Juliana Mialoundama (born 1993), French basketball player
- Juliana Mickwitz (1889–1976), translator, linguist and cryptanalyst, inducted into the Cryptologic Hall of Honor
- Juliana Moechtar (born 1989), Indonesian film actress and model
- Juliana Negedu (born 1979), Nigerian basketball player
- Juliana Nero (born 1979), Vincentian cricketer
- Juliana Neuhuber (born 1979), Austrian director, screenwriter, and artist
- Juliana Makuchi Nfah-Abbenyi, Cameroonian professor and writer
- Juliana Ngleya Moko (born 2000), Angolan Paralympic athlete
- Juliana Nogueira (born 1988), Brazilian volleyball player
- Juliana Obiong (born 1966), Equatoguinean sprinter
- Juliana Olayode (born 1995), Nigerian actress and activist
- Juliana Oxenford (born 1978), Argentine-born Peruvian journalist, television and radio presenter
- Juliana Paes (born 1979), Brazilian actress
- Juliana Paiva (born 1993), Brazilian actress
- Juliana Panizo Rodríguez (1947–2024), Spanish academic
- Juliana Pasha (born 1980), Albanian singer
- Juliana Pegues, American writer, performer, and activist
- Juliana Geran Pilon, Romanian-American writer and academic
- Juliana Rimane (born 1959), French Guianan politician
- Juliana Rojas (born 1981), Brazilian filmmaker
- Juliana Rotich (born 1977), Kenyan information technology professional
- Juliana Sakae, Brazilian journalist and filmmaker
- Juliana Santos, multiple people
- Juliana Sayumi Terao (born 1991), Brazilian chess player
- Juliana Schalch (born 1985), Brazilian actress
- Juliana Schroeder, American behavioral scientist
- Juliana Seraphim (born 1934), Palestinian artist
- Juliana Shonza (born 1987), Tanzanian politician
- Juliana Silva (born 1983), Brazilian beach volleyball player
- Juliana Silveira (born 1980), Brazilian actress and singer
- Juliana Skrywer (born 1987), Namibian footballer
- Juliana Snapper, American opera singer
- Juliana Sokolová (born 1981), Slovak philosopher and writer
- Juliana Sorelli, French filmmaker and designer
- Juliana Spahr (born 1966), American poet, critic, and editor
- Juliana Stratton (born 1965), American politician
- Juliana Suter (born 1998), Swiss alpine skier
- Júlíana Sveinsdóttir (1889–1966), Icelandic painter
- Juliana Szalonna (born 1959), Hungarian volleyball player
- Juliana Szczepanowska, British concert pianist and author
- Juliana Taimoorazy (born 1973), Assyrian-American activist
- Juliana Thiessen-Day (born 1980), Norwegian-Canadian model and beauty pageant contestant
- Juliana Urtubey, American teacher
- Juliana Velasquez (born 1986), Brazilian mixed martial artist
- Juliana Velásquez, Colombian actress, singer, composer, writer and presenter
- Juliana Veloso (born 1980), Brazilian diver
- Juliana Viana Vieira (born 2004), Brazilian badminton player
- Juliana Walanika (1846–1931), court musician in the Kingdom of Hawaii
- Juliana Wang (1929–1993), American cinematographer
- Juliana Westray (1778–1838), American stage actress
- Juliana Yasin (1970–2014), Singaporean artist and curator
- Juliana Yendork (born 1972), Ghanaian-American long jumper and triple jumper

== Animals ==
- Juliana (dog) (died 1946), a Great Dane awarded two Blue Cross medals

== See also ==
- Juliana Maria
- Juliane, a given name
- Iuliana, a given name
- Yuliana, a given name
- Uliana, a list of people with the given name Uliana or Ulyana
