= Julianne =

- Gender: Female

Other names
- Related names: Julian, Juliana, Julio, Julia, Julius, Julie

Julianne is an English language given name ultimately derived from the Latin Iuliana, the feminine form of Iulianus (Julian), probably via the French Julienne. The name is often thought to be made up from Julia + Anne.

Notable people with the given name Julianne include:

- Julianne Adams (born 1966), Australian wheelchair basketball player
- Julianne Baird (born 1952), American soprano of mainly Baroque works, both opera and sacred music
- Julianne Bournonville, a name used by Julie Alix de la Fay, a Belgian ballet dancer and dance pedagogue
- Julianne Boyd (born 1944), American theater director
- Julianne Buescher (born 1965), voice actress and puppeteer
- Julianne Courtice, English squash player
- Julianne Dalcanton, American astronomer
- Julianne Hough (born 1988), American professional ballroom dancer and country music singer
- Julianne Kirchner (born 1991), Marshallese swimmer, who specialized in sprint freestyle events
- Julianne MacLean, Canadian author of romance novels, primarily historical romance
- Julianne Malveaux (born 1953), African-American economist, author, liberal social and political commentator and businesswoman
- Julianne McNamara (born 1965), American artistic gymnast
- Julianne Michelle (born 1984), American film and television actress
- Julianne Moore (born Julie Anne, 1960), American actress
- Julianne Morris (born 1968), American actress
- Julianne Nicholson (born 1971), American actress
- Julianne Ortman (born 1962), US senator (R) Minnesota
- Julianne Phillips (born 1960), American actress, model, and former wife of Bruce Springsteen
- Julianne Pierce, Australian new media artist, curator, art critic, writer, and arts administrator
- Julianne Regan (born 1962), English singer, songwriter, and musician known for her work with the band All about Eve
- Julianne Schultz AM (born 1956), Australian academic, journalist and author
- Julianne Séguin (born 1996), Canadian figure skater
- Julianne Sitch (born 1983), American professional soccer defender
- Nicole Julianne Sullivan (born 1970), American actress, comedian, and voice artist
- Julianne Tarroja (born 1983), Filipina singer-songwriter

Fictional characters with the name include

- Julianne Potter, a character played by Julia Roberts in My Best Friend's Wedding
- Jill, full name Julianne Stingray, the main character of VA-11 Hall-A

== Variations ==
- Juliane
- Juliana
- Julianna
- Julienne (given name)
- Giuliana
- Iuliana, Iouliana (Ιουλιάνα)
- Iulianna, Ioulianna (Ιουλιάννα)
- Uliana
- Yuliana
