= Uliana =

Uliana, Uljana, or Ulyana is an East Slavic feminine given name Russian: Ульяна, a variant of Juliana. Notable people with the name include:

== Nobility ==
- Uliana of Tver (c. 1325–1391), daughter of Prince Alexander of Tver and second wife of Algirdas, Grand Duke of Lithuania
- Uliana Olshanska, Grand Duchess of Lithuania from 1418 to 1430
- Uliana Paletskaya (died 1569), a princess of Russia by marriage to Yuri of Uglich

== Other ==
- Ulyana Barkova (1905–1991), Soviet dairy farmer, twice Heroine of Socialist Labour
- Uliana Batashova (born 1994), Russian modern pentathlete
- Uliana Donskova (born 1992), Russian group rhythmic gymnast
- Uliana Dubrova (born 2002), Ukrainian speed skater
- Ulyana Gromova (1924–1943), Soviet Ukrainian partisan
- Uliana Kaisheva (born 1994), Russian biathlete
- Uliana Kliueva (born 2002), Russian diver
- Uliana Kravchenko (1860–1947), Ukrainian poet
- Ulyana Lopatkina (born 1973), Russian prima ballerina
- Uliana Malashenko (born 1988), investigative reporting journalist
- Ulyana Nesheva (born 1983), Ukrainian painter and tattoo artist
- Uliana Nigmatullina (born 1994), Russian biathlete
- Uliana Perebinosova (born 2001), Russian artistic gymnast
- Uljana Semjonova (1952–2026), Latvian basketball player
- Ulyana Sergeenko (born 1979), Russian fashion designer
- Ulana Suprun (born 1963), Ukrainian-American physician and former Minister of Healthcare of Ukraine
- Ulyana Trofimova (born 1990), Uzbekistani rhythmic gymnast
- Uliana Vasilyeva (born 1995), Russian curler
- Ulyana Voitsik (born 1989), Belarusian ice hockey player
- Uljana Wolf (born 1979), German poet and translator

== See also ==
- Juliana, a given name
- Yuliana, a given name
- Iuliana, a given name
