= Juliane =

Juliane may refer to:

- Emilie Juliane of Schwarzburg-Rudolstadt (1637–1706), German countess and hymn writer
- Juliane Aisner (1919–1980), World War II French Resistance Agent
- Juliane Banse (born 1969), German soprano and lieder singer
- Juliane Hvid (born 1998), Danish steeplechase runner
- Juliane Köhler (born 1965), German theatre, television, and film actress
- Juliane Koepcke (born 1954), German mammalogist, sole survivor of the 1971 crash of LANSA Flight 508
- Juliane Kokott (born 1957), the German Advocate General at the Court of Justice of the European Communities
- Juliane Leopold (born 1983), German journalist
- Juliane Rasmussen (born 1979), Danish rower
- Juliane Rautenberg (born 1966), former German television actress
- Juliane Schenk (born 1982), female badminton player from Germany
- Juliane Sprenger-Afflerbach (born 1977), retired German hurdler
- Juliane Waehler (born 1986), German politician
- Juliane Werding (born 1956), German singer
- Marianne and Juliane, 1981 film directed by Margarethe von Trotta
- Princess Juliane of Saxe-Coburg-Saalfeld (1781–1860), German princess of the ducal house of Saxe-Coburg-Saalfeld

== See also ==
- Juliane Marie
- Julianne
- Juliana
- Julianna
