= Mikail Akar =

German artist (born 2012)

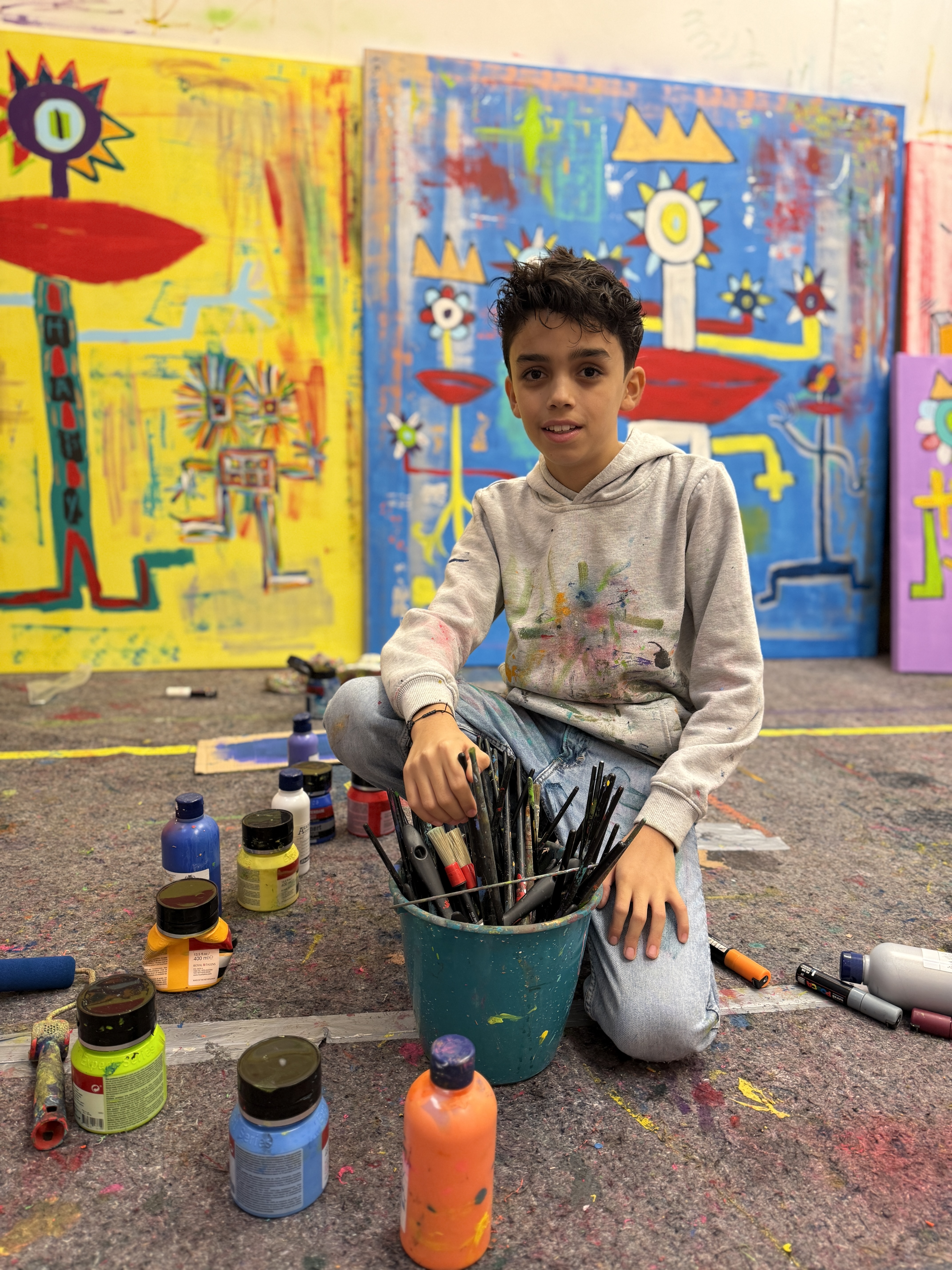
- Mikail Akar (2025)
- Born: 9 October 2012 (age 13); Cologne
- Known for: contemporary art
- Style: abstract
- Website: www.mikailakar.com

Mikail Akar (9 October 2012) is a German painter. He became publicly known in 2017 at the age of 4. Since, he has held various art exhibitions in several major cities, making him internationally known. Akar's painting style is usually described as Abstract Expressionism.

== Life ==
Akar was born in October 2012 in Cologne, Germany. He is fluent in English, Turkish, and German. He has two younger siblings and visits the International School Cologne.

Akar started to paint at the age of four, at that time, his family had no connection to the art world. His father posted a picture of his first painting on Facebook, which led to several offers to buy it and requests for interviews. After Akar's first exhibitions, his parents gave up their jobs and founded the artists' agency Gallery Ehren Art Cologne, representing Mikail Akar and other artists.

In 2021, Akar took part in the German game show Klein gegen Groß, hosted by Kai Pflaume.

== Work ==
Akar paints with undiluted acrylic paints, and his paintings often contain geometric ornamentation. They are influenced by abstract expressionism and neo-impressionism. Akar himself describes his painting style as action painting in the style of Jackson Pollock and Jean-Michel Basquiat, because he applies various colors directly on the canvas, one after the other, directly from the tube, or sometimes with a boxing glove.

In addition to paintings, Akar paints on various vehicles, including vintage cars such as a Chevrolet Monte Carlo, a VW T1 and a 1976 Mustang. A Rolls-Royce redesigned by Akar sold for €400,000.

He also painted with 24-carat gold on the observation deck of the Empire State Building. In 2024, Akar prepared two vehicles designs as part of a collaboration with Uber Germany.

Akar regularly supports social projects and works with the association Kunst hilft geben, which sells works of art and donates the proceeds to charitable causes. He has collaborated with artists, public figures and companies, including Peter Maffay and Manuel Neuer. In 2022, he designed labels for water bottles of the German company Gerolsteiner Brunnen.

=== Exhibitions ===
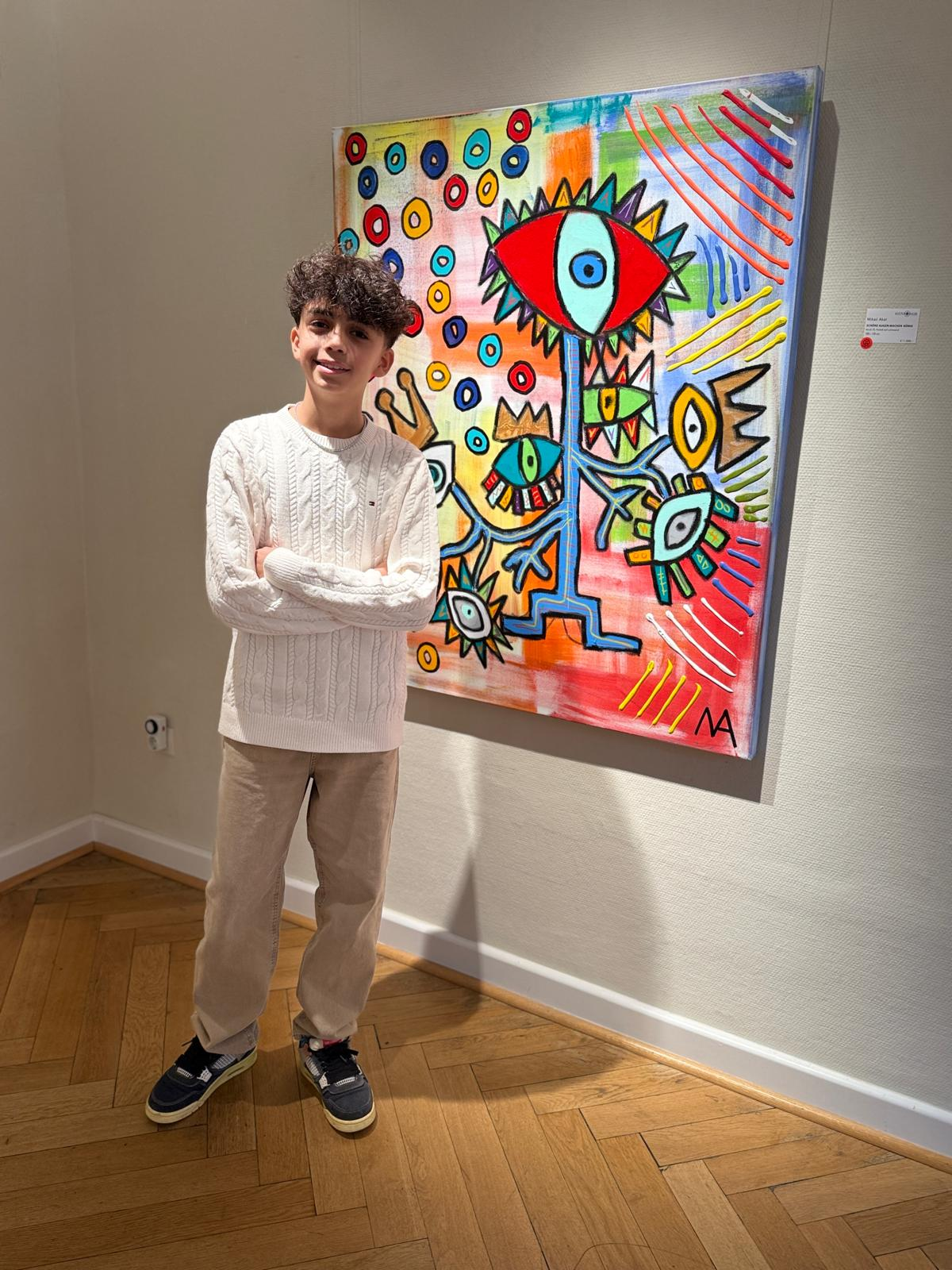
Mikail Akar (Exhibitions)

In 2017, Akar began showing his paintings at exhibitions. Initially, these took place in his home Cologne. In 2018, he held his first national exhibition in Großkarlbach, Rhineland-Palatinate. In the following years, Akar held several art exhibitions throughout Germany, including exhibitions in Berlin in 2019 and at Cologne Bonn Airport. For the latter exhibition, he painted dismantled fuselage panels of a decommissioned Airbus A310.

Since 2022, Akar has also shown his art at international art exhibitions, including in Zürich, New York, Vienna, and Istanbul, fetching five-figure sums. His work King of New York was auctioned at the Guggenheim Museum, New York in 2022 for US$16,000, and he donated the revenue to an art project for children.

In 2023, Akar's work was featured at ArtExpo New York Fine Art Fair 2023. In the same year, an exhibition of his works was held at Bensberg Castle in Germany.

In 2024, Akar presented his largest artwork to date at the Waldorf Astoria Hotel as part of Berlin Art Week: a 50-metre-long spray-painted poster that took him four months to complete. The same year, he presented the exhibition No Doubt, first at Art Cologne and later in New York City.

In April 2025, he exhibited at Gerhardt Braun Gallery in Palma de Mallorca, followed by another exhibition at Bensberg Castle in July. In September 2025, he presented the exhibition Evolution at the Galerie Kulturraum in Speyer.
