= Julianna =

Julianna is a feminine given name. Notable people with name include:

- Julianna Allan, Australian actress
- Julianna Baggott (born 1969), American novelist and essayist
- Julianna Barwick, American musician
- Julianna Michelle Childs (born 1966), American lawyer and jurist
- Julianna Cannamela (born 1997), American gymnast
- Julianna Di Giacomo (born 1975), American opera singer
- Julianna Géczy (1680-1714), Hungarian noblewoman
- Julianna Goldman (born 1981), American television journalist
- Julianna Guill (born 1987), American actress
- Julianna Grace LeBlanc (born 2004), American YouTuber, actress, singer, and model
- Julianna Lisziewicz (born 1959), Hungarian doctor
- Julianna Margulies (born 1966), American actress
- Julianna McCarthy (born 1929), American actress
- Julianna Miskolczi (born 1983), Hungarian sports shooter
- Julianna Naoupu (born 1990), New Zealand netball player
- Julianna O'Connor-Connolly (born 1961), Caymanian politician
- Julianna Pacheco (born 2002), Puerto Rican footballer
- Julianna Peña (born 1989), American mixed martial artist
- Julianna Raye, American singer-songwriter
- Julianna Révész (born 1983), Hungarian fencer
- Julianna Smoot (born 1967), American presidential campaign
- Julianna Terbe (born 1997), Hungarian chess player
- Julianna Tudja (born 1979), Hungarian hammer thrower
- Julianna Tymoczko (born 1975), American mathematician
- Julianna Zobrist (born 1984), American musician

== See also ==
- Juliana
