= Ulyana Nesheva =

Ukrainian painter and tattoo artist

- Ульяна Нешева
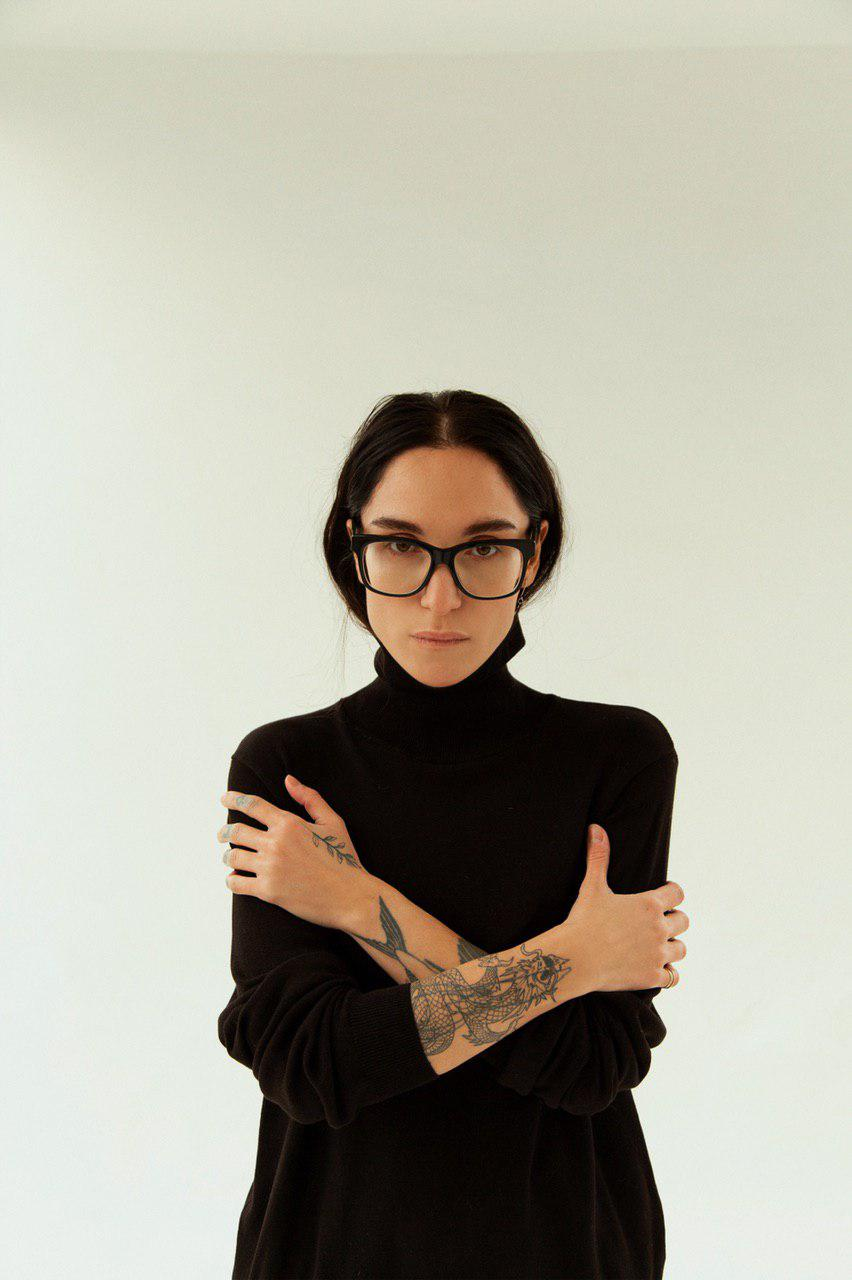
- Ulyana Nesheva in 2019
- Born: Ulyana Akhsarbekovna Kumaritova; 26 November 1983 (age 42); Kerch, Crimean Oblast, Ukrainian SSR, Soviet Union
- Education: Academy of Design and Arts KSADA, Kharkiv, Ukraine
- Occupations: Painter; tattoo artist
- Years active: 2000–present
- Notable work: Blue Blood (2011); Eyes (2012); Outskirts of Sleep (2013); Pigeon Lady (2013); Aroma of Silence (2013); Black Flame (2013); Skull (2013)
- Movement: Contemporary art, Postmodern art
- Website: 619studio.com

Ulyana Akhsarbekovna Nesheva (born on 26 November 1983; Ukrainian: Уляна Нєшева) is a Ukrainian contemporary painter and tattoo artist, born in Kerch, Crimea, Ukrainian SSR.

Following her education at the Academy of Design and Arts KSADA in Kharkiv, Nesheva moved to Kyiv, where she became a painter. Since her premiere in 2010, Nesheva hosted 6 solo exhibitions and created over 50 paintings. Her paintings are displayed in private galleries of Ukraine, in the Institute of Contemporary Art, Miami as well as in private collections.

In 2014, Nesheva began a career of a tattoo artist. In 2017, she opened her tattoo studio "Nesheva Art Room" in Kyiv. Nesheva is consistently cited as one of the best and sought-after minimalist tattoo artist of Ukraine, known for her long branches tattoos and floral style. Nesheva's clientele includes Ukrainian artists, such as Dorofeeva, Yevhen Filatov, Nata Zhyzhchenko and Irina Gorovaya. She subsequently expanded into fashion and graphic design.

== Early life ==
Ulyana Nesheva was born on 26 November 1983, in Kerch.

Her grandmother, Angelina Volozhnina, instilled a love for art in her granddaughter by taking her to art museums in Dresden, where Nesheva was inspired by Raphael masterpiece the Sistine Madonna. In 1990, she enrolled in the Roman Serdiuk's School of Fine arts. Nesheva showed a passion and a skill for drawing from an early age. Her teachers, including artist Viktor Zaporozhets, noticed her artistic abilities, and mother encouraged her talent and any creative endeavors. In May 1998, at the age of fifteen, Nesheva graduated as an external student from Zhelyabov High school in Kerch. In 1999, Nesheva started taking private classes from Ukrainian academic artist Tetiana Dydnik.

In 2000, Nesheva moved to Kharkiv, where she enrolled to Academy of Design and Arts KSADA. At age 16, Nesheva set off for the first time on her own; as she stated: "First thing I did was buying a canvas and a couple of oil paints tubes, and that was the moment when I've found my direction as an artist. Since then, I only work with oil painting, as acrylic paint same as gouache, doesn't have an inner strength in it for me." At the same time, she became interested in film photography and graphic arts; she continued mastering her skills as an artist by extensively producing many illustrations, lithographs and conceptual photography series.

== Career ==
=== Painting ===
Nesheva began her artist career in the early 20s, exploring a variety of painting techniques and creating graphic arts primarily for local publications. Eventually, she developed a style that combined absolute isolation, "conservation" of meanings, crazy play of color pallette, photographic accuracy, which still does not cross the line of photorealism and the ability to let the viewer in. Her breakthrough as an artist, Nesheva did in June 2010, when she won the first place in Kyiv Art Week; the same year she displayed her work at Berlin Art Week.

In the subsequent years since her debut, Nesheva has taken an increasingly experimental approach in her stylistic shifts. Within the six years period, from 2010 to 2016, Nesheva had six personal exhibitions and created over 50 paintings. Her approach to artwork is consistently rich, nuanced and thought-provoking. To this day, Nesheva's artwork can be found at Institute of Contemporary Art, Miami and mostly in the private collections.

In March 2015, Nesheva created illustrations for the book of poetry "Island Being" by Artash Adriasov.

Despite being a versatile artist, Nesheva recalls painting as her favorite form of art: "The painting is like a mirror. You will never see in the reflection of what you do not have inside. Tattoos die with people, but paintings will live forever."

=== Tattoo art ===
In 2014, despite her success as a painter, Nesheva decided to try herself in the other shape of art, as she stated: "Once I felt the need for a new way of self-realization, and I decided to dive into Tattoo art. As a result, intriguing acquaintance grew into love of life. For me, tattooing is primarily art, and when art is transformed into an integral part of the personality, it causes delight." She got her first tattoo of a cat on the shoulder at 16, in the unknown studio in Kerch. However, Nesheva's interest in Tattoo art raised to the new level, when her friend, Andrei Bezpamyatny, who is a realism tattoo artist, showed her how to use the machine. It took her two days to learn and she mastered her skills by making her first tattoo on herself, of two-headed girl in a dress, which represents a close connection with her sister.

Many celebrities have tattoos done by Nesheva: Nadia Dorofieieva, Yevhen Filatov, Nata Zhyzhchenko. She is known for her own unique minimalist style with the finest lines and a laconic plot, as she said: "I started working in minimalism intuitively, just smoothly moved from graphics to what is close to me. Minimalism is the purity of lines, laconicism, restraint and elegance. The peculiarity of such tattoos is that they become a harmonious addition to the graceful lines of the body with its skin color, all these moles and bones." For a long time, a sprig of lavender became a brand mark of her tattoo style. As Nesheva stated: "My popularity came with a tattoo of the long branch for one of my clients. At that time, such sketches were not considered by anyone as a tattoo at all. But that was the moment, which precisely defined my style. Now you can find a lot of similar tattoos and every time I see them, I feel proud to be the first." Being renowned as one of the pioneers in floral and minimalist style, Nesheva is considered to be one of the best tattoo artists of Ukraine.

On 4 February 2017, Nesheva opened her own tattoo studio "Nesheva Art Room" in Kyiv. In November 2019, she became a member of the National Tattoo Association of Ukraine and a judge in the first online tattoo festival in Ukraine.

In November 2020, Ulyana Nesheva opened a new tattoo studio "6:19", pursuing the concept of minimalism as a reflection of her style and artistic vision. Architectural Balbek Bureau worked on the design of the project.

=== Fashion ===
Nesheva built a repertoire in the fashion business as well. In 2012, Nesheva made clear her interest to work in the clothing design industry, as she stated: "It was always difficult for me to find simple clothes that would not distract from my face. Therefore, I've decided to create my own brand: things so simple that they could be called clothing sketches, but I was solo involved in design and visual part." She launched the clothing line "NESHEVA Sketch Clothing" with her friend, Valeriya, however, the partnership ended six months later, but Nesheva's involvement in the fashion world was not over. In 2015, Nesheva collaborated with Ukrainian label TTSWTRS, as the baseline for each new collection of brand was works of acclaimed tattoo artists from all over the world. She created sensual minimalist drawings to combine with the clothes organically, as brand preserves clothing as a second skin and tattoos as the only true way to decorate it, which demonstrates self-expression and freedom in the collections.

In 2017, Nike had released a white collection which consisted of brand's main hits – from the dream of all Nike Air Max 90 mods to those designed specifically for Nike Cortez athletes, where Nesheva was a model to represent Air Force 1. In 2018, Nesheva was invited to take a part in the collaboration project of Puma and Buro 24/7.

On 14 July 2019, Nesheva collaborated with the Ukrainian jewelry brand Côte & Jeunot and launched the capsule collection of accent pendants and earrings. Her illustrations were transformed into gold and silver pieces with a commitment to exceptional craftsmanship.

== Artistry ==
Nesheva's transition from being an unknown painter to becoming a prosperous artist took place in a short space of time. In 2008, she moved to Kyiv and started working on her first big art piece. In June 2010, Nesheva participated in Kyiv Art Week, an international art week of contemporary art fair, where she was noticed by various critics and curators.

Her breakthrough as an artist, Nesheva made in 2010, when her painting "Blue Blood" took the first place and traveled to Berlin Art Week. In particular Leonora Yanko, a Ukrainian gallerist, was impressed by her work and invited Nesheva to have her first solo exhibition, that opened in May 2011 at Hudgraf Art Gallery, Kyiv.

In 2011, Nesheva presented her work in Petersburg Art Week, Russia. In June 2011, she made a Studio space in her Kyiv apartment, where she commenced a series of paintings for her upcoming personal exhibition. The first retrospective to be held of her work was the "NoConcept" exhibition at Mystetskyi Prostir 365 Gallery, Kyiv, in 2011. On 7 December 2011, two paintings "Chichkan's Skull" and "Eyes" from "NoConcept" collection were sold on the auction for the private collections of Vasily Bondarchuk and Alena Vinnitskaya where Vladimir Dantes was the auctionist. Traditionally, the interpretation of Nesheva's works at the visual level comes from the subdued emotional tone of what they represent compared to what is actually depicted. For example, as stated by Art Ukraine, "In Contemporary art, which is so closely relying on text and ideas, the lack of concept is perceived as concept. That is why the title of Nesheva's project, "NoConcept", may seem as just another non-conformist game, "rebellious art". But at this show, unlike with most Contemporary art, you won't find anything that speaks of protest, or urges one to do something. Most of the works, presented at the show, are portraits. That is – representations of people's faces, something that in art-history is usually (and sometimes mistakenly) named "portrait". But these are not portraits of real people and not even collective images. Done in photorealist way but still not completely following the conventions of the technique, her characters do not lack realness. These ‘molds’ of reality seem very much like hand of prehistorical men in caves – they exist no matter who and why there were made."

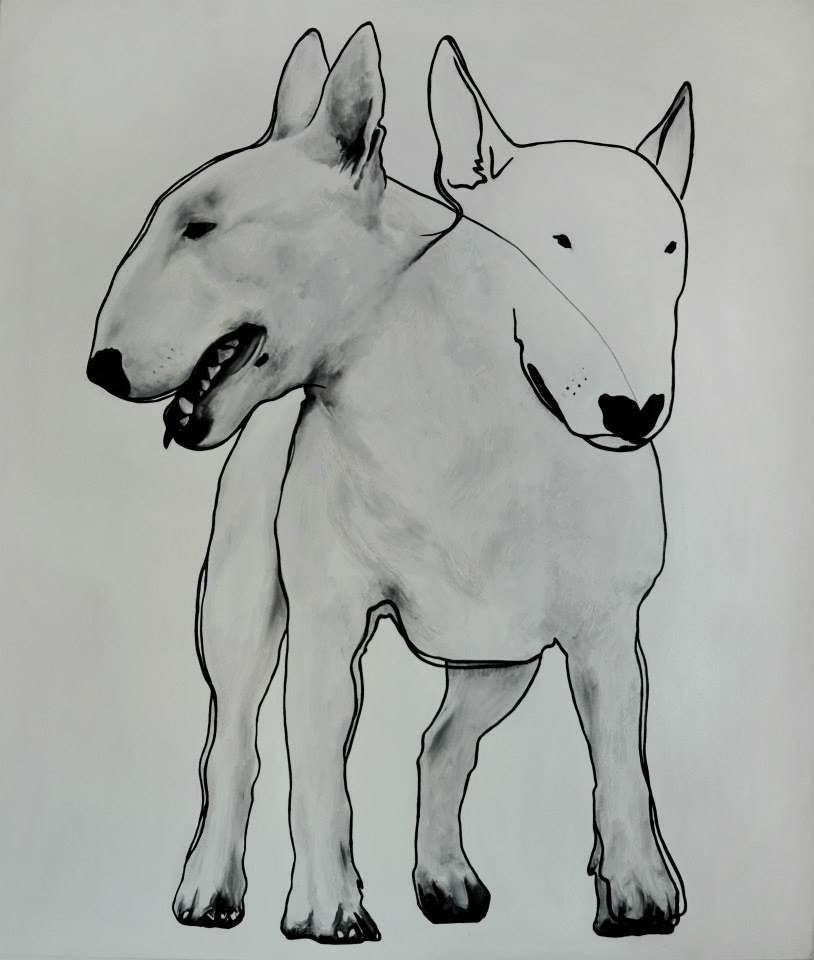
Dogs, 2013, oil on canvas, Nesheva Ulyana, Greter Art Centre, Kyiv

In 2012, Nesheva took part in Festival of Contemporary arts "Art Olimp", Kyiv, and in the "First Odesa International Festival of the Arts", Odesa. On 14 March 2012, Nesheva's painting "Blue Dog" was presented as a lot at the charity fundraising event "Share the warmth of the soul with a four-legged friend" to raise money for the charitable foundation "Sirius", the animal shelter.

On 22 November 2012, Nesheva had her second exhibition "DRAMA" at Mystetskyi Prostir 365 Gallery, Kyiv. Nesheva said about her work: "Souls lost in love, in prostration. Weightlessness. Passion. Grace. With / without faces, without masks, without borders ... “DRAMA” is a series of paintings depicting semi-naked female bodies. But this is by no means blatant vulgarity and not even eroticism – it's just a woman. Alive woman, packed in silence. Each of these bodies cary an emotion that seeks attention and comfort, which is not able to break free. These paintings are silent, but silent loudly." In December 2012, Nesheva's paintings "Woman" and "No Thoughts" were published in the City magazine.

In 2013, Nesheva participated in Modern Art Festival, Kyiv. In 2013, Nesheva had "Retrospective" exhibition at Mainstream Girls Gallery, Kyiv. This exhibition lionized the artist, brought into full public view the scope of her old and unseen artistry, and became a turning point, which marked the beginning of a new period of the author's work. On 29 November 2013, Nesheva was one of the painters presented in the "Hype" exhibition at Kosoy Kaponir Fortress, Kyiv.

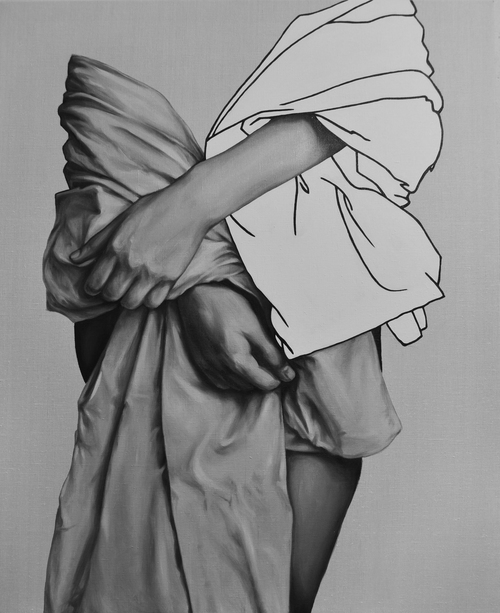
Pigeon Lady, 2013, oil on canvas, Nesheva Ulyana, Institute of Contemporary Art, Miami

In April 2014, Greter Art Centre, Kyiv, organized the exhibition "Phoenix. Rebirth". Nesheva was one of the four artists presented: Maria Krivopishina, Petra Rubar, a world-renowned sculptor Dmitry Yves, whose works are in the private collection of Patricia Cass and Monica Bellucci. This exhibition is relevant for socio-cultural development and society in general, as it brings up the subject of contrast of the external and internal state of the soul, entering a new level of perception. While "Phoenix. Rebirth" exhibition bears the theme of rebirth, restoration, artists' work illustrates the ambiguous idea of death for the sake of life. The essence of the exhibition is to show the transition from the past to the present and such an ephemeral future.

In June 2014, Greter Art Centre hosted another extensive exhibit "Illusion...Reality?" Nesheva was among two other represented artists: Liliya Isyk and Petra Rybar. Nesheva designates her series of paintings as a "dramatic story, which is full of subtle emotion and photographic accuracy of the image." As stated by Darina Fialko for "Ukurier" magazine: "Among the exhibited work of Nesheva, one can fall in love with black and white paintings, which, as stated in the press release, are "silent out loud". Every brush stroke gives you chills, as if canvases speak to the viewer differently: loudly and in whispers, strictly and sensually."

In 2016, Ukrainian art dealer, Anna Turayeva, offered Nesheva to exhibit series of her works at the "Art Basel", the premier art show of the Americas offering a premier platform for renowned artists. Five of Nesheva's paintings: "Pigeon Lady", "A Girl in A Musk", "Black Flame", "Birch", "Skull" and "Eyes" are displayed in Institute of Contemporary Art, Miami, to this day. In December 2016, Nesheva presented her paintings at the art exhibition within the Fashion Air Days at the Contemporary Art Center M17, Kyiv.

== List of artworks ==
Nesheva is a versatile artist, she produced over 50 paintings in her career in addition to creating illustrations for books, a great number of drawings, graphics and various projects. This is a partial list of important artworks produced by Nesheva from 2011 to 2013.

- 2011: Blue Blood
- 2011: Branches
- 2011: 3
- 2011: Chinese woman
- 2011: Eyes
- 2011: Fish-parrot
- 2011: Girl
- 2011: Light
- 2011: Morning
- 2011: Blue Dog
- 2011: Blue Red
- 2011: Palette
- 2011: Self-portrait
- 2011: Self-portrait. Red
- 2011: Self-portrait. Yellow
- 2011: Mask
- 2011: Toy horse
- 2011: Water
- 2011: Wind
- 2011: Mulatto
- 2012: Naked
- 2012: Birch
- 2012: A Girl in a Mask
- 2012: Peas
- 2012: Dogs
- 2012: Woman
- 2012: Silence
- 2013: Outskirts of Sleep
- 2013: Emptiness
- 2013: Target
- 2013: Red Line
- 2013: Flying Hands
- 2013: Aroma of Silence
- 2013: Beauty of Ageing
- 2013: Swift
- 2013: Pigeon Lady
- 2013: Split
- 2013: Flying Hands
- 2013: Field Flower
- 2013: Ficus
- 2013: Reflection
- 2013: Skull
- 2013: Black Flame
