= Sakae =

Sakae may refer to:

== Places in Japan ==
- Sakae, Chiba (Japanese: 栄町; sakae-machi), a town in Chiba Prefecture
- Sakae, Niigata (Japanese: 栄町; sakae-machi), a town in Niigata Prefecture
- Sakae, Nagano (Japanese: 栄村; sakae-mura), a village in Nagano Prefecture
- Sakae-ku, Yokohama (Japanese: 栄区; sakae-ku), a ward of the city Yokohama, Kanagawa
- Sakae, Nagoya (Japanese: 栄; sakae), the downtown district of Nagoya (Naka-ku)

== Other ==
- Sakae (given name)
- Sakae Ringyo, a Japanese manufacturer of bicycle parts
- Nakajima Sakae, a Japanese World War II radial aircraft engine

== See also ==
- Saka, an ancient people of Central Asia
