= Dropel Fabrics =

Dropel

Dropel Fabrics, Inc.
- Type: Private
- Founded: 2015; 11 years ago
- Founders: Sim Gulati and Bradley Feinstein
- Headquarters: New York, New York
- Area served: International
- Products: Dropel cotton fabrics
- Website: dropelfabrics.com

Dropel Fabrics is an American technology company that develops, manufactures, and licenses sustainable treatments for natural fabrics to make spill proof and stain proof threads. The company is known for creating the world's first water and stain repellent naturals fabrics that maintain their softness and breathability.

== History ==
Dropel was founded in 2015 by Sim Gulati following his research in material sciences and innovative textile processes. In 2014, after observing a broader need in apparel for innovation in natural fabrics, Gulati developed cotton fabrics using sustainable nanotechnology treatments for cotton in an effort to supplant less durable and less environmentally friendly clothing applications for polyester and other synthetics. In 2015 the company consulted with Amanda Parkes, Ph.D., termed a “fashion scientist” from Massachusetts Institute of Technology by Industry magazine.

Dropel incubated in New York based fashion accelerator, New York Fashion Tech Lab, and launched at the incubator's June 2015 demonstration day.

The New York Times reported that Dropel “patented a nanotechnology process that bonds hydrophobic polymers with natural fibers on the molecular level to make them water- and stain-repellent, a process that can be licensed by clothing brands.” The company has integrated its technology with brands AREA NYC, CEAM and Mister French. Dropel was part of the inaugural class of Fashion For Good, a sustainable fashion accelerator led by Kering, Plug and Play Ventures, Galleries Lafayette and the C&A Foundation. Fashion Tech Lab, a venture-capital accelerator led by Russian retail entrepreneur Miroslava Duma, Gaetan Bonhomme, Alex Moore, Cybernaut Venture Capital, and Full Tilt Capital invested in Dropel's seed round of funding. In 2015, Business Insider named Dropel Fabrics one of the “100 most exciting startups in New York City.”
