= Juliane Waehler =

German politician (born 1986)

Member of the Landtag of Saxony-Anhalt
- Assuming office 6 October 2026
- Succeeding: Daniel Sturm
- Constituency: Naumburg

Personal details
- Born: 1986 (age 39–40)
- Party: Alternative for Germany
- Parent: Lothar Waehler (father)

Juliane Waehler (born 1986) is a German politician who was elected member of the Landtag of Saxony-Anhalt in 2026. She is the daughter of Lothar Waehler.

== Live ==
Juliane Waehler was born in Zeitz in 1986. Her father is AfD-politican and also MP of Landtag of Saxony-Anhalt Lothar Waehler. She did an apprenticeship in business administration and worked as administration employee. She worke for AfD newspaper "Deutschland-Kurier" and was employee of AfD MP Martin Reichardt. Waehler appeared as host of the far-right podcast „Scharf rechts“ ("sharp right").

In May 2026 she at the so called „Remigrationscongress“ of Martin Sellner from Identitarian movement in Porto.

Her political main interst is according to her, that children are save an will not be "indoctrinated".
