= Yuliana =

Yuliana or Yulianna is a feminine given name. People with the name include:

- Yuliana Angulo (born 1994), Ecuadorian sprinter
- Yulianna Avdeeva (born 1985), Russian pianist
- Yulianna Beziazychna (born 2013), Ukrainian–Dutch pianist
- Yuliana Bolívar (born 1990), Peruvian judoka
- Yuliana Doncheva (born 1965), Bulgarian politician, businesswoman and television personality
- Yuliana Fedak (born 1983), Ukrainian retired tennis player
- Yuliana Glinka (1844–1918), Russian occultist
- Yulianna Karaulova (born 1988), Russian singer
- Yuliana Korolkova (born 1994), Russian model
- Yuliana Lizarazo (born 1993), Colombian tennis player
- Yuliana Marinova (born 1967), Bulgarian retired sprinter
- Yuliana Mikheeva (born 1977), Armenian swimmer
- Yuliana Monroy (born 1998), Colombian tennis player
- Yuliana Peniche (born 1981), Mexican actress
- Yuliana Pérez (born 1981), American triple jumper
- Yuliana Salakhova (born 1984), Russian sprint canoer
- Yuliana Slashcheva (born 1974), Russian media manager
- Yuliana Tasno (born 1984), Indonesian association football player
- Yuliana Telegina (born 2002), Israeli rhythmic gymnast
- Yulianna Tunytska (born 2003), Ukrainian luger
- Yuliana Yaneva (born 1998), Bulgarian freestyle wrestler
- Yulyana Yushchanka (born 1984), Belarusian sprinter

== See also ==
- Yuliyana Plevnelieva (born 1975), Bulgarian journalist and First Lady of Bulgaria from 2012 to 2017
- Julijana, a given name
- Juliana, a given name
- Iuliana, a given name
- Uliana, a list of people named Uliana or Ulyana
