= Dominican Republic nationality law =

Dominican Republic nationality law is regulated by the 2015 Constitution, Law 1683 of 1948, the 2014 Naturalization Law #169-14, and relevant treaties to which the Dominican Republic is a signatory. These laws determine who is, or is eligible to be, a citizen of the Dominican Republic. The legal means to acquire nationality and formal membership in a nation differ from the relationship of rights and obligations between a national and the nation, known as citizenship. Nationality in the Dominican Republic is typically obtained either on the principle of jus soli, i.e. by birth in the Dominican Republic to Dominican parents or legal resident foreigners; or under the rules of jus sanguinis, i.e. by birth abroad to a parent with Dominican nationality. It can also be granted to a permanent resident who has lived in the country for a given period of time through naturalization or for a foreigner who has provided exceptional service to the nation.

== Acquiring Dominican nationality ==
Dominicans may acquire nationality through birth or naturalization.

=== By birthright ===
The 2015 Constitution specifies in Article 18, Section 1, that those entitled to birthright nationality are:

- Those born within the territory of the Dominican Republic, who are not children of diplomats, illegal aliens, or foreigners in transit;
- Those born abroad to a Dominican parent, who upon reaching their eighteenth birthday choose Dominican nationality and renounce their former nationality or obtain dual citizenship; or
- Those who had birthright citizenship according to the laws before the current constitution entered in to force.

=== By naturalization ===
Naturalization requires completion of an application of request that is supported by the requisite documents to establish eligibility. These are submitted to the Ministry of the Interior and Police (Spanish: Ministerio de Interior y Policía) for processing and approved by the Directorate of Naturalization. Requirements, detailed in the 1948 Law #1683, include that applicants must be adults who have attained the age of 18, or 16 if married or authorized by a legal guardian, who have established a residence within the territory for a minimum of 2 years. The 2015 Constitution in Article 18, Section 1, and Law #1683 specify that those who can naturalize are:

- Foreigners who have established temporary residence for 5 years and then permanent residence for 2 years in the country.
- Foreign men who have had legal residence for six months and who are married to a Dominican woman;
- Foreign women who are married to a Dominican man may obtain a waiver to residency requirements at the discretion of the President of the Dominican Republic;
- Adoptees of Dominican parents;
- Foreign wives and minor children obtain automatic naturalization through the naturalization of their spouse without meeting residency requirements;
- Foreign-born adults of naturalized Dominicans who have established residence for one year; or
- Persons who, at the discretion of the President, are deemed to have provided exceptional services to the nation.

== Loss of Dominican nationality ==
Naturalized Dominicans can lose their nationality by leaving the country for ten years, or establishing residency abroad within one year of being naturalized. Accepting employment from a foreign government, committing crimes against the state, behaving immorally, or having committed fraud in a naturalization application. They can also have their nationality suspended for the period in which they may be incarcerated for capital crimes.

=== Haitian-Dominicans ===
In 2004, the Nationality Law (Ley 285–04) was modified and defined temporary immigrant laborers and foreign residents of the border between Haiti and the Dominican Republic as transient regardless of how long they had resided in the country. The law opened debate on whether children who had been born in the Dominican Republic could be citizens if their parents were considered to be temporary immigrants. In the 2005 case Yean and Bosico vs. Dominican Republic challenged the law under the pretext that denying the right of nationality to the two girls rendered them stateless, impacting their ability to attend school, and made them socially vulnerable. The Inter-American Commission on Human Rights ruled in favor of the girls and ordered the Dominican Republic to modify their laws to comply with provisions of the American Convention on Human Rights. In part, the ruling stated "la condición del nacimiento en el territorio del Estado es la única a ser demostrada para la adquisición de la nacionalidad, en lo que se refiere a personas que no tendrían derecho a otra nacionalidad" ("the condition of birth in the territory of the nation is the only one to be demonstrated for the acquisition of nationality, with regard to persons who would not have the right to another nationality").

In 2010, the constitution was modified to include all undocumented residents as transients. Debate regarding the verbiage to be used in the amendment focused solely on Haitian migrant workers. Article 18, as adopted stated that Dominican citizens were "people born in the national territory, with the exception of the sons and daughters of foreigners who are members of diplomatic and consular legations, foreigners who are in transit or reside illegally in Dominican territory". In a ruling on the case of Juliana Deguis against the Central Electoral Board, issued in 2013, by the Constitutional Court of the Dominican Republic anyone born in the country after 1929 to foreign parents who were in transit did not have Dominican nationality. The court advised authorities to audit birth records beginning on June 21, 1929 to the present and revoke Dominican nationality from anyone whose parents were classed as in transit. The ruling left around 200,000 people, primarily those of Haitian descent, in danger of stateless.

The international community, including Amnesty International, the Inter-American Commission on Human Rights and Human Rights Watch, expressed concern about the ruling. In response, in 2014 the government passed a Naturalization Law (Ley 169–14) which divided foreigners who had been born in the Dominican Republic between 1929 and 2007 into two categories. The first group, of approximately 55,000 people, were children of undocumented migrants whose births had been recorded in the Civil Registry. They would be granted legal amnesty, their actions during the period when they believed themselves to be Dominican would remain legal and binding, and they would be issued Dominican identification cards, as citizens. The second group, of approximately 53,000 people, was made up of children who had been born in the country but whose births had not been recorded in the Civil Registry. They were required to register as foreigners and could be naturalized if they could provide documentation proving their birth and residency in the country prior to the 2015 deadline. Only 8,755 people in the second group were able to provide evidence and register. A third group of people, those who were born between 2007 and 2010 were required to register as foreigners and could apply for ordinary naturalization after two years.

The Inter-American Commission on Human Rights ruled in 2014 that the judgement in the Deguis case and Law 169-14 violated the American Convention and ordered the Dominican Republic to adopt measures to nullify the portions of legal documents that were contrary to the American Convention. According to the United Nations Office for the Coordination of Humanitarian Affairs, 288,466 undocumented immigrants, primarily of Haitian descent, applied for residency and work permits after passage of Law 169–14, but only a few hundred permits were granted. Immigration officers deported 15,754 undocumented immigrants to Haiti between August 2015 and January 2016 and another 113,320, persons voluntarily left during the same period. The law disproportionately affected Haitian-Dominican women because though they automatically derive citizenship if they marry a Dominican national, their undocumented status brings the validity of their children's nationality into question. As undocumented, women in this situation often must work in sectors where their employment is unreported.

== Dual nationality ==
The Dominican Republic authorized dual nationality under the 1994 Constitution.

== History ==
For three centuries, the Captaincy General of Santo Domingo was ruled by Spain, except for a brief period from 1795 to 1808, when it was ceded to France by the Treaty of Basel. Returned to Spain after the Battle of Palo Hincado, the island continued under Spanish administration and laws until declaring the independence of the Republic of Spanish Haiti in 1821. The Constitutional Act of 1821, provided in Article 9 that all free men of any color or religion who were born in the territory or foreign-born men who were married to native women who had lived in the country for three years were nationals. Article 4, stated that the new nation would align as one of the states of Gran Colombia. Colombia's indifference to the Dominican plan allowed Haitian president Jean-Pierre Boyer who offered protection to Spanish Haiti to annex the country into the Republic of Haiti in 1822.

The period of this union, introduced the French civil code to the Dominican legal system, when it was adopted by the republic in 1825. In the Haitian version, nationality was granted to anyone born in Haiti, or to Haitian parents, but it could be lost by acquiring another nationality. Wives of foreigners who lost their nationality because of their marriage were required to sell their holdings, if they owned property in Haiti. Foreign fathers were prohibited from owning property and if they inherited property in Haiti, were required to pay the cash value of it to their Haitian children. After twenty-two years of annexation, the Dominican Republic gained independence on 27 February 1844. The Dominican Constitution of 1844 did not define nationality or citizenship, but rather specified that Dominicans were people born in the territory, Spanish citizens who had Dominican parents and descendants born abroad to ancestors of the territory. All three classifications, required establishing residence in the country. It also allowed foreigners married to Dominican women to become Dominican after a three-year residency period.

Though the Constitution of 1844 stated that valid laws previously enacted in the territory remained in effect, the Congress passed a law in 1845, to organize the legal system (Ley 41) on the parent documents. In other words, by passage of the law the Civil Code of Haiti was no longer in effect in the Dominican Republic, but instead the Civil Code of France. The French code in Article 12 automatically bestowed the nationality of the husband upon his foreign wife, Article 19 removed the nationality of a native woman who married a foreigner, and Article 1124 legally incapacitated married women to the status of minor children under the law. Because of Haitian attempts to reclaim the territory, leaders sought annexation with various nations and in 1861, the Dominican Republic was reannexed by Spain. The following year a Civil Code was published in Spanish for the first time, but upon regaining independence in 1865, the French Code was reinstated. Between 1874 and 1884, texts in Spanish were created and repealed, resulting in continuance of the French Code in the Dominican Republic until 1884.

In 1884, the government produced a new Civil Code in Spanish. It did not require a Dominican woman to lose her nationality upon marriage but required foreign women to take Dominican nationality upon marriage to a Dominican husband. Numerous revisions were made to the constitution after 1844, but the majority of changes were directed at political reorganization, rather than nationality. As early as 1912, immigration laws were passed limiting the immigration of people of African, Asian, and Oceanian descent. The Constitution of 1929, article 8, stipulated that regardless of the nationality of the parents, children born in the Dominican Republic were nationals, unless their foreign parents were representatives of a foreign government or transient. It also provided that children born abroad to Dominican parents were nationals unless they were legally considered nationals in their place of birth. In this situation, upon reaching majority, they could choose Dominican nationality by following the legal declaration procedures.

That same year, 1929, a Nationality Law (Ley 1227) was passed. Among its provisions were articles to allow Dominican women who had lost their nationality because of marriage to repatriate if their marriage was terminated, by establishing a residence in the territory and making the proper declaration to the Secretary of State for the Interior and Police. It also allowed wives of naturalized men to gain nationality by request, without meeting any requirements, as long as the husband authorized her change in nationality. Children of naturalized men automatically derived Dominican nationality, but could renounce it within a year of reaching their majority. Foreign wives were unable to acquire independent nationality or naturalize separately from their spouses. Foreign women who had gained Dominican nationality retained it even after termination of the marriage, unless they remarried, because Dominican law did not permit the expatriation of nationals. Mothers could not change the nationality of their legitimate children while married, unless she had custody. Upon her husband's death, she gained the same rights as the child's father.

In the 1930s various changes to immigration law charged prohibitive fees for residency permits to anyone who was not Caucasian. In 1933, Tulio Manuel Cestero, the Dominican Republic's delegate to the Pan-American Union's Montevideo conference, signed the Inter-American Convention on the Nationality of Women, which became effective in 1934, without legal reservations. Nationality Law 1683, passed in 1948, established that a Dominican woman who had lost her nationality through marriage to a foreign male could repatriate by establishing residence in the country and requesting re-acquisition of her nationality. Under its provisions, foreigners could become naturalized by residing in the territory for ten years; by residing in the country for five years and owning a business or residence; by residing in the territory for two years and either being married to a Dominican woman or cultivating a parcel of land thirty hectares or larger; and by living in the country for six months and having been hired to provide specialized services to the armed forces. Wives of foreigners and minor unmarried children of foreigners could also be naturalized upon request. The president had the ability to bestow Dominican nationality on people who had rendered service to the nation, or foreign women who retained their nationality after marriage with a Dominican husband. Conditional nationality, which could become permanent after five years, was available to foreigners and their families who worked in the government agricultural colonies.
