= Juliana Devoy =

American-Macanese nun, missionary and social worker

Sister Juliana Devoy (7 February 1937 – 14 December 2020) was an American-born Catholic nun, missionary, and social activist, residing in Macau. She joined the Sisters of the Good Shepherd, and conducted missionary work in Southeast Asia, eventually settling in Macau where she spent the rest of her life. She was active in efforts to reform Macau's laws governing domestic violence. She founded and managed the Good Shepherd Center, a charitable institution in Macau, which provided support to women in crisis. She was the recipient of several honors, including the Medal of Altruistic Merit from the Macau government in 2013.

== Biography ==
Juliana Devoy was born on 7 February 1937 in Norfolk, Nebraska in the United States of America. Her father was in the American Air Force, and she had six siblings. She spoke English and Cantonese. She graduated high school in 1954, and spent a year at the California State University studying social services, but did not continue her education at the time, later receiving a master's degree in theology at the age of 60. She died in Macau at the age of 83, on 14 December 2020.

== Work ==
Devoy joined a Catholic order of nuns, the Congregation of Our Lady of Charity of the Good Shepherd, in Los Angeles on 12 September 1954, after receiving a brochure about them at her school. She spent a year at the Motherhouse in Angers in France, and took her vows in 1960.

From 1960 to 1988, Devoy engaged in missionary work in several south-east Asian countries, arriving in Hong Kong in 1963 to work in a residential home for teenage girls, and later working in several other countries, including mainland China, Thailand, Vietnam, South Korea and Myanmar. She spent some time in Xian and in Taiwan, where she taught in English.

In 1988, Devoy moved to Macau, and in 1990, she founded the Good Shepherd Center, a charitable refuge for women in crisis, and particularly to serve those affected by domestic violence and human trafficking. Devoy was active in efforts to reform domestic violence laws in Macau, and lobbied for a bill which was eventually passed in 2016. The bill altered domestic violence from a 'semi-public' crime (i.e. placing responsibility on the victims to prosecute) to a 'public crime' (making it the responsibility of the government to prosecute). She was a member of a coalition that succeeded in an introducing a bill to reform this in 2011, and worked with other Macanese leaders including Agnes Lam, Melody Chia-Wen Lu and Cecilia Ho. In 2014, Devoy presented a speech on the law concerning domestic violence in Macau before the United Nations Committee on Economic, Social and Cultural Rights, urging them to press for reforms. In response to the bill passing in 2016, Devoy led a celebratory parade in Macau. She was also active in raising funds for individual philanthropic cases, such as for reconstructive surgery for victims of domestic violence. She served on the Macau Government's Human Trafficking Deterrent Measures Concern Committee, from 2009 onward, and in 2015, she publicly called for better prosecution of persons accused of human trafficking in Macau.

In 2013, the Macau government awarded her with the Medal of Altruistic Merit for her work. She also received a medal of philanthropic merit from the Portuguese government in 1997, and the Good Shepherd Crisis Center, which she founded and managed, won a business award in Macau in the non-profit organizations category in 2013.
