= Yuri of Uglich =

Russian prince (1532–1563)

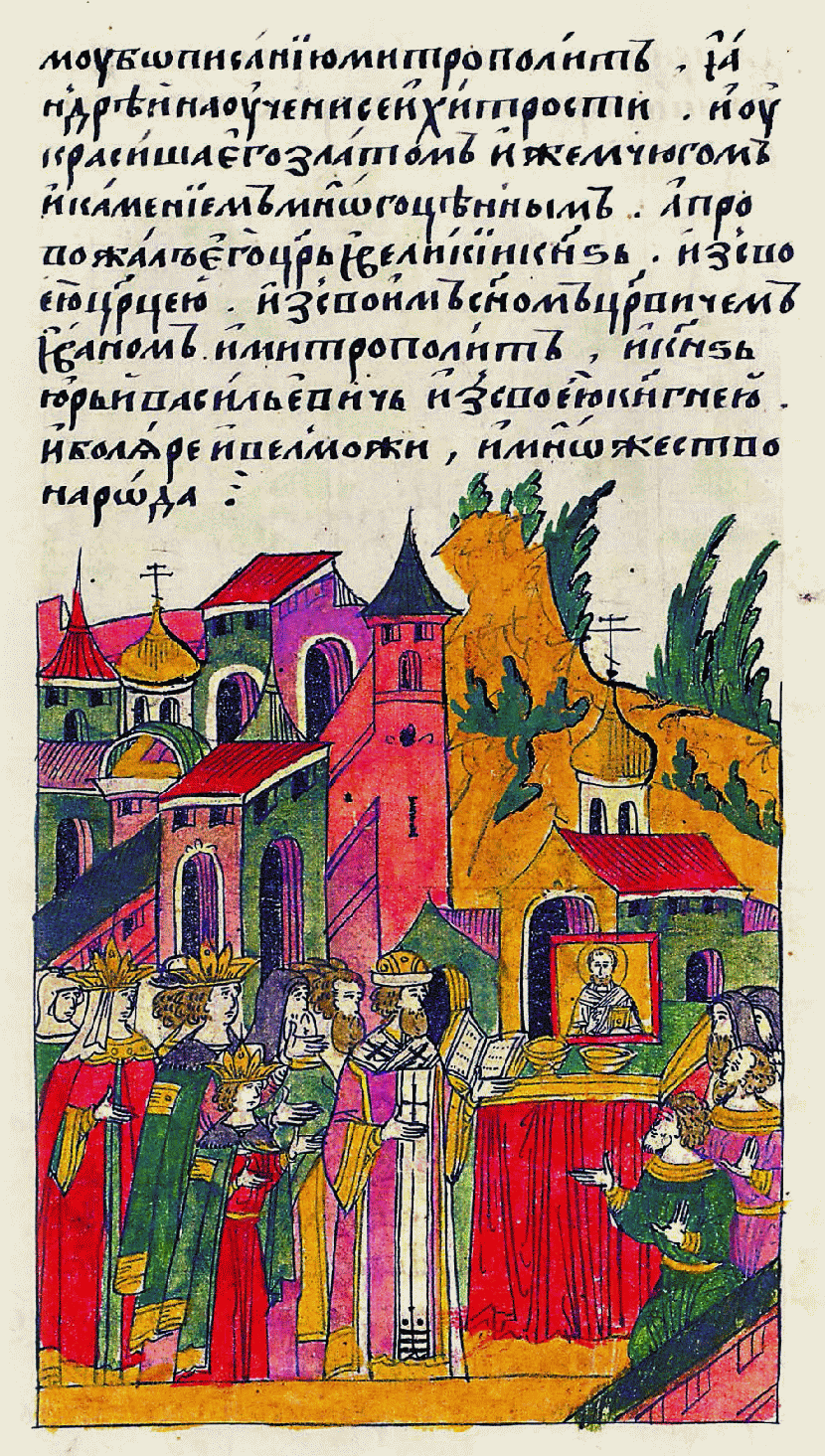
This miniature from the Illustrated Chronicle of Ivan the Terrible shows Yuri and his brother Ivan bidding farewell to a revered icon.

Yuri Vasilievich (Russian: Юрий Васильевич; 30 October 1532 – 24 June 1563) was a Russian prince who was the only brother of Ivan the Terrible. He was never considered to be a candidate as heir to the Russian throne or a political figure in his own right, ostensibly due to some kind of mental or physical health issues, although nothing can be said on his condition with certainty. He ruled the appanage principality of Uglich on the Volga.

== Life ==
Yuri was the second son of Vasily III of Russia and Elena Glinskaya. He was a year and a half old when his father died of a leg abscess, and six when his mother was apparently poisoned. According to letters written by his older brother Ivan to another Russian prince, Andrey Kurbsky, the two children customarily felt neglected and offended by the mighty boyars from the Shuisky and Belsky families. An excerpt from their correspondence, describing their mistreatment, reads as, "My brother Yuri, of blessed memory, and me they brought up like vagrants and children of the poorest... What have I suffered for want of garments and food!" Unlike his brother who spent his spare time in learning theology, Yuri was apparently only interested in food and games including ice-skating. Yuri accompanied his brother during the latter's coronation as tsar, and was later given a private residence with servants. On 16 June 1552, during the Russo-Kazan war, Yuri was given full charge of state affairs while his brother accompanied the army to Kazan. Yuri was married on 3 November 1547 to Princess Ulyana of Palekh (Paletskaya) and had a son, Vasili, in 1559. The child died 11 months later. Yuri died three years later from natural causes. His wife was sent to the Novodevichy Convent. Yuri's property was inherited by his elder brother.

Andrei Kurbsky called him "mute and mindless", whereas the later Kazan History describes him as "simple". Sources suggest that he did talk on ceremonial and diplomatic occasions, and his alleged deafness, implied by some later historians, is never mentioned in sources.
