= Sakae (given name) =

- Gender: Both

Origin
- Origin: Japanese
- Meaning: Different meanings depending on the kanji used

Sakae (written: 栄, 榮 or さかえ in hiragana) is a unisex Japanese given name. Notable people with the name include:

Surname

- Juliana Sakae Brazilian journalist and filmmaker
- Kazuhito Sakae (栄 和人; born 1960), Japanese wrestling coach and retired wrestler
- Maiko Sakae (栄 舞子; born 1986), Japanese pop singer

Name

- Sakae Esuno (えすの サカエ; born 1973), Japanese manga artist
- Sakae Kubo (久保 栄; 1900–1958), Japanese playwright and director
- Sakae Menda (免田 栄; 1925–2020), Japanese activist
- Mōkonami Sakae (猛虎浪 栄; born 1984), Mongolian sumo wrestler
- Sakae Morimoto (森本 さかえ; born 1977), Japanese field hockey player
- Sakae Ōba (大場 栄; 1914–1992), Japanese military officer
- Sakae Osaki (大崎 栄; born 1964), Japanese long-distance runner
- Sakae Osugi (大杉 栄; 1885–1923), Japanese anarchist
- Sakae Saitō (斉藤 栄; born 1933), Japanese writer
- Sakae Takahashi, Japanese politician
- Sakae Takahashi (footballer) (高橋 栄), Japanese footballer
- Sakae Tamura (photographer) (田村 榮; 1906–1987), Japanese photographer
- Sakae Tamura (nature photographer) (田村 栄; 1910–2003), Japanese photographer
- Sakae Tsuboi (壺井 栄; 1899–1967), Japanese writer and poet
