= Julienne =

Julienne, Francophone given name, may refer to:

People

- Julienne Bušić (born 1948), American writer, political activist, and airplane hijacker
- Julienne Mavoungou Makaya, African Union Economic, Social and Cultural Council official
- Julienne Mathieu, early French silent film actress
- Julienne Salvat (1932–2019), French teacher, poet, femme de lettres, actress
- Rémy Julienne (1930–2021), French driving stunt performer and coordinator, assistant director, and champion driver

Other

- Julienning, a technique of shredding food into long, thin strips
- Julienne, Charente, a commune of the Charente département in France
- Julienne (crater), on the Moon
