= Daniel Sturm (politician) =

German politician (born 1977)

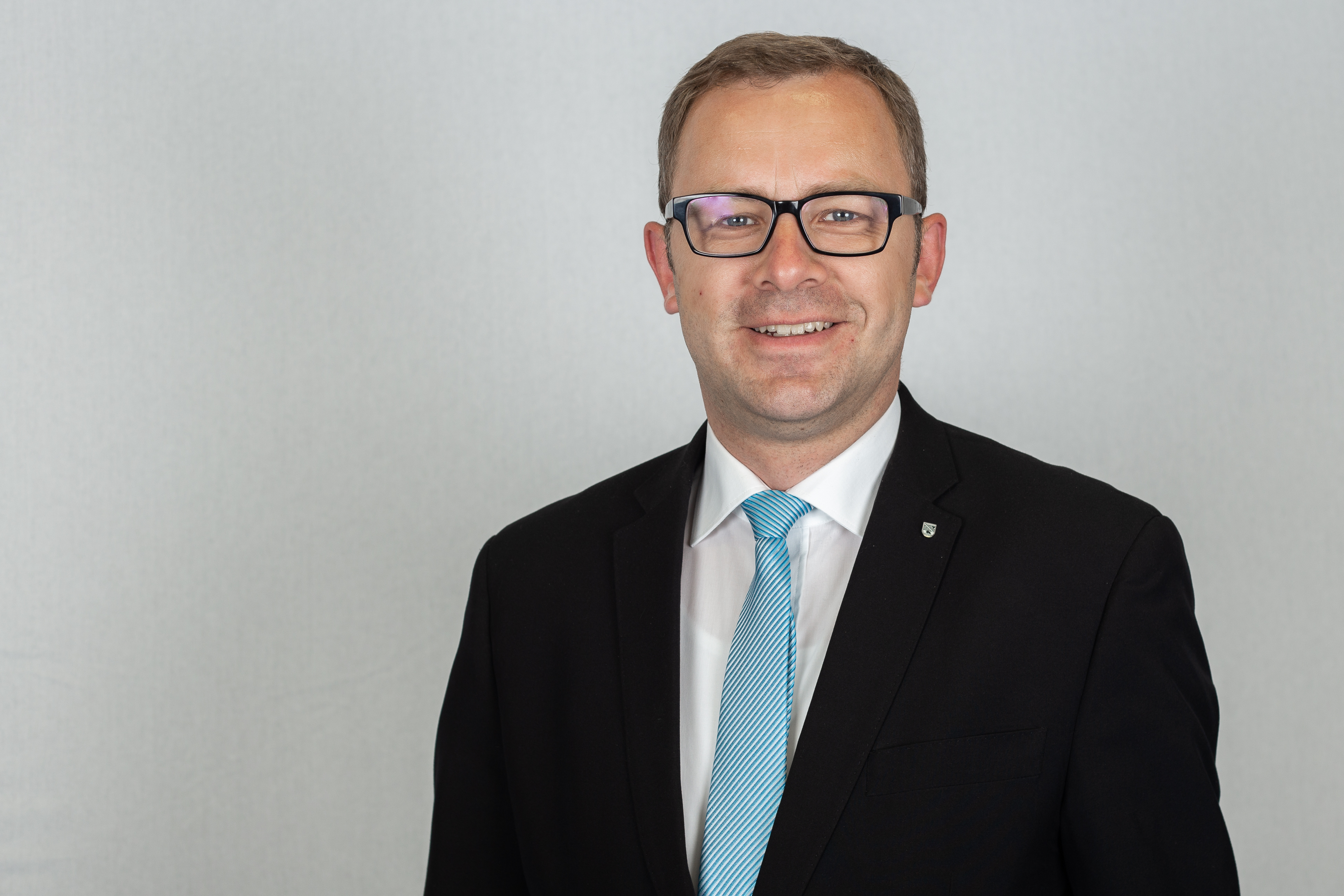
- Sturm in 2018

Member of the Landtag of Saxony-Anhalt
- Incumbent
- Assumed office 24 April 2006
- Preceded by: Curt Becker
- Constituency: Naumburg

Personal details
- Born: 6 March 1977 (age 49)
- Party: Christian Democratic Union (since 1993)

Daniel Sturm (born 6 March 1977) is a German politician serving as a member of the Landtag of Saxony-Anhalt since 2006. He has served as chairman of the committee on federal and European affairs and media since 2019.
