= Iuliana =

Iuliana is a feminine given name. It may refer to:

- Iuliana Buhuș (born 1995), Romanian rower
- Iuliana Cantaragiu (born 1975), Moldovan politician
- Iuliana Colnic (born 2004), Moldovan footballer
- Iuliana Demetrescu (born 1990), Romanian football referee
- Iuliana Enescu (born 1955), Romanian volleyball player
- Iuliana Gorea-Costin (born 1957), Moldovan diplomat and politician
- Iuliana Hobincu (born 1954), Romanian handball player
- Iuliana Măceșeanu (born 1981), Romanian épée fencer
- Iuliana Munteanu (born 1955), Romanian rower
- Iuliana Roxana Nucu (born 1980), Romanian retired volleyball player
- Iuliana Paleu (born 1990), Romanian canoeist
- Iuliana Pantelimon (born 1975), Romanian swimmer
- Iuliana Popa (born 1996), Romanian rower
- Iuliana Simon (born 1934), Romanian cross-country skier
- Iuliana Țăran (born 1995), Romanian sprint canoeist

== See also ==
- Yuliana, a given name
- Juliana, a given name
- Uliana, a list of people with the given name Uliana or Ulyana
