= Juliana Moechtar =

Indonesian film actress and model (born 1989)

- Born: 1 May 1989 (age 37); Aceh, Indonesia
- Other name: Ully
- Occupation: actress
- Years active: 2005-2022
- Spouse(s): Herman Sikumbang (m.2012-2018); Nur Wahyudi (m.2022)

Juliana Moechtar (born 1 May 1989) is an Indonesian film actress and model. She began her career as a model in 2005 before pursuing her career in acting. She also emerged as one of the finalists at the 2010 Princess Indonesia event. Juliana also modelled for Indonesian TV channels including Trans TV.

She married Seventeen guitarist Herman Sikumbang in 2012. He died on 22 December 2018 at the age of 36 during the 2018 Sunda Strait tsunami which was triggered by volcanic eruption as the Seventeen band performed onstage near the Tanjung Lesung shore.
