= Juliana Mansvelt =

New Zealand social geographer

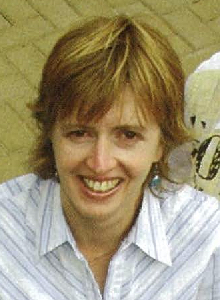
- Mansvelt in 2006
- Awards: Distinguished Service Award, Distinguished New Zealand Geographer Medal

Academic background
- Education: University of Sheffield, Massey University
- Thesis: Leisure services and local development. (1993)

Juliana Mansvelt is a New Zealand social geographer and is a full professor at Massey University, specialising in the geographies of ageing and consumption.

== Academic career ==
After a BA(Hons) in geography at Massey University, Mansvelt completed a PhD titled Leisure Services and Local Economic Development at the University of Sheffield. Mansvelt then moved to Massey University, rising to full professor in 2022. Mansvelt is part of the Health and Ageing Research Team (HART) at Massey University, an interdisciplinary team investigating determinants of health and wellbeing in ageing people. She is also a part of the Centre for Advanced Retail Studies. In 2023 she began a project with Aisling Gallagher on the decisions older people make with regard to housing. The baby boomer generation have high home ownership compared to later generations, but little research had been done about factors influencing their choices as they age. "Our research aims to investigate the political, social and economic landscape in which choices and decisions to divest homes are made, and the choices, decisions and experiences of housing decumulation for people aged 55 and over", Mansvelt said.

Mansvelt published a book in 2005, Geographies of Consumption, which analyses consumption from a spatial perspective. She has edited two further books, a guide to "green consumerism" and with Michael Roche and Russell Prince, Engaging Geographies, which is an overview of research relating to landscapes, lifecourses and mobilities. She is a member of the editorial board for Geographical Research, Kotuitui: New Zealand Journal of Social Sciences Online, and The International Journal for the Scholarship of Teaching and Learning.

== Honours and awards ==
Mansvelt was awarded the New Zealand Geographical Society's Distinguished Service Award in 2013 and the Distinguished New Zealand Geographer Medal in 2021. She is a senior fellow of the Higher Education Academy, and has been awarded three teaching awards.

== Selected works ==
- Mansvelt, Juliana (2005). Geographies of Consumption. ISBN 978-0-7619-7430-7. LCCN 2004099543. OCLC 57355289. OL 3313180M. Wikidata Q123425456.
- Mansvelt, Juliana (2011). Green Consumerism: An A-to-Z Guide. ISBN 978-1-4129-9685-3. LCCN 2011002874. OCLC 700468440. OL 25076983M. Wikidata Q123425467.
- Mansvelt, Juliana; Prince, Russell; Michael Roche (2014). Engaging Geographies: Landscapes, Lifecourses and Mobilities. ISBN 978-1-4438-6183-0. Wikidata Q123425468.
- Stephens, Christine Vivienne; Breheny, Mary; Mansvelt, Juliana (2014). "Healthy ageing from the perspective of older people: a capability approach to resilience". Psychology & Health. 30 (6): 715–731. doi:10.1080/08870446.2014.904862. PMID 24678916. Wikidata Q39263541.
- Mansvelt, Juliana (2008). "Geographies of consumption: citizenship, space and practice". Progress in Human Geography. 32 (1): 105–117. doi:10.1177/0309132507080623. Wikidata Q104892684.
- Mansvelt, Juliana; Breheny, Mary; Christine Stephens (2013). "Pursuing security: economic resources and the ontological security of older New Zealanders". Ageing & Society. 34 (10): 1666–1687. doi:10.1017/s0144686x13000342. Wikidata Q123424574.
