= Miroslava Duma =

Russian entrepreneur and investor (born 1985)

- Мирослава Дума
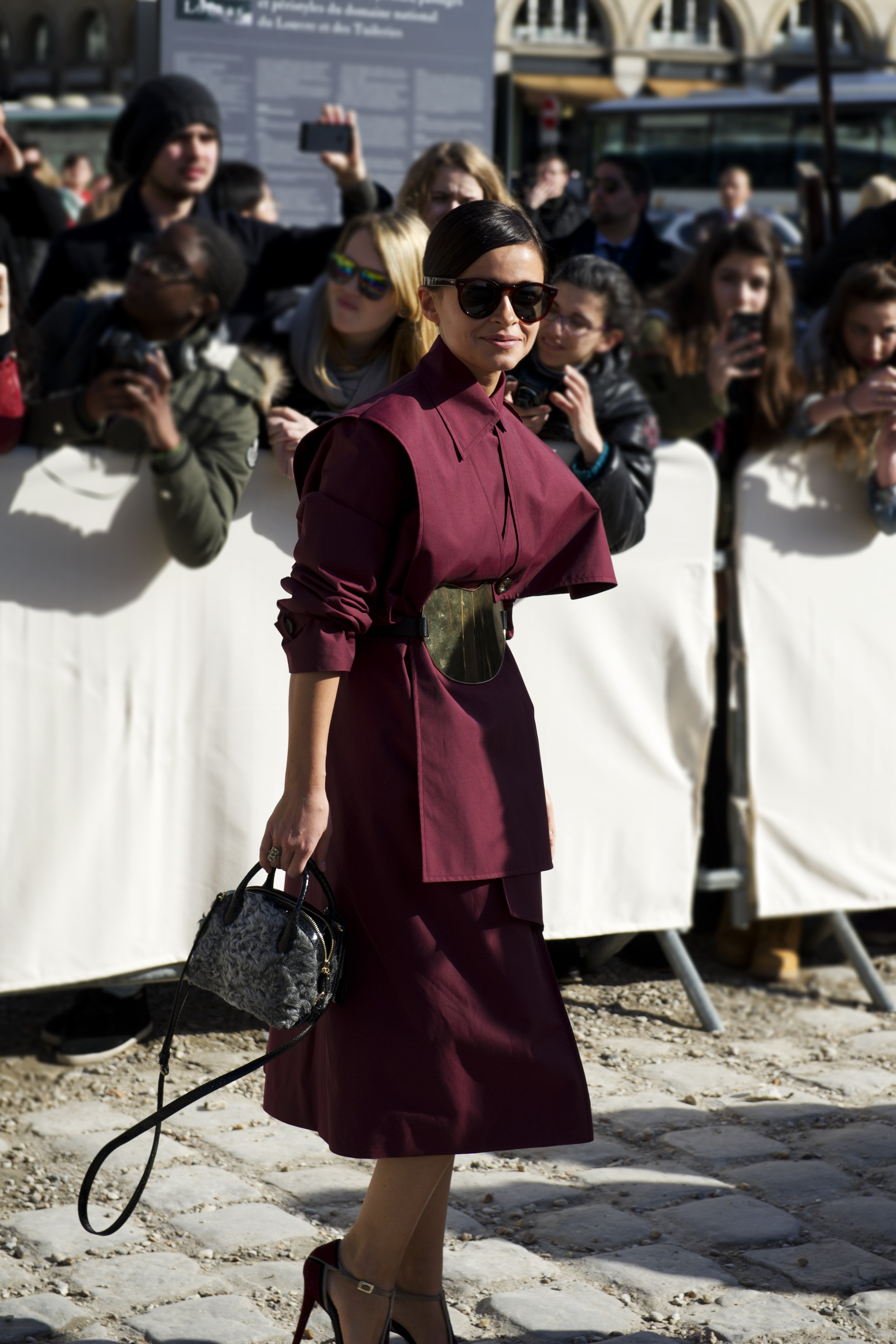
- Louis Vuitton autumn-winter 2014 fashion show
- Born: Miroslava Vasilyevna Duma; 10 March 1985 (age 40); Surgut, Ural Federal District, Russian SFSR, Soviet Union
- Occupations: Digital entrepreneur, investor, speaker
- Known for: CEO and Founder of Fashion Tech Lab (FTL), Buro247.com
- Spouse: Aleksey Mikheev (divorced)
- Children: 3
- Website: miroslavaduma.com

Miroslava Vasilyevna Duma (Russian: Мирослава Васильевна Дума; born 10 March 1985) is a Russian digital entrepreneur and investor in international fashion. She is also the founder of Buro 24/7, a digital company, and the CEO and founder of Future Tech Lab, a venture capital fund.

== Early life ==
Duma was born on 10 March 1985 in Surgut, Russian SFSR, shortly after her family moved there from Ukraine. Her father, Vasiliy Duma, was a senator in the Russian Federation until 2011. From 1997 to 1998, he headed a department of the Ministry of Fuel and Energy and he was later president of LUKOIL-Transnefteprodukt.

== Personal life ==
Miroslava was married to Aleksey Mikheev, a Russian entrepreneur and son of Russian oligarch Aleksandr Mikheyev. They have three children.

== Education ==
Duma graduated from the Moscow State Institute of International Relations (MGIMO) in 2008 with a Master's degree in International Business and Business Administration.

== Career ==
Duma was an editor at Harper's Bazaar. She moved into freelance writing, working for magazines including Vogue, Tatler, ForbesWoman and Glamour (Russian versions).

Duma founded Buro 24/7 in 2011, a website for art, architecture, cinema, fashion, music and style. In July 2017, Buro 24/7 acquired a majority stake in the fashion magazine System.

In 2016, Duma co-founded The Tot, a children's fashion company, with Nasiba Adilova.

In 2017, Duma founded Future Tech Lab (FTL), an investment and technology company.

In 2018, Duma was removed from the board of The Tot and Buro 24/7, after she shared a note on Instagram from fashion designer Ulyana Sergeenko containing a racial slur, and after a video was released of her making transphobic comments. Duma publicly apologized after the incidents.

Duma has invested in Reformation (a greenfashion brand), Dropel Fabrics, RewardStyle, and Finery. Duma was a member of the advisory board of Diamond Foundry of San Francisco in 2016.

Duma joined New York Fashion Tech Labs as a mentor. The NYFTL is a twelve-week program for fashion technology startups.

Duma is one of the founders of PANGAIA, the materials science lifestyle apparel company.

== International speaker ==
Miroslava has featured as a keynote speaker and a panelist at Web Summit, Founders Forum, Slush, Financial Times Business of Luxury, Alibaba Global Women Entrepreneurship Forum in China, St Petersburg International Economic Forum (SPIEF), The Copenhagen Fashion Summit, DLD conference in Munich, Vogue Fashion Festival in London, Nikkei Pioneers Asia in Japan, and New York Academy of Sciences: The Change Fashion Challenge.
