= Juliana Lunguzi =

Malawian politician (born 1971)

Juliana Mdamvetsa Lunguzi (born December 19, 1971) is a Malawian politician and former United Nations official. She was MP for Dedza East Constituency from 2014 to 2019.

== Life ==
Juliana Lunguzi's father, Mcwilliam Lunguzi, was a former Inspector General of Police in Malawi. She trained as a midwife, and worked for the United Nations in Malawi. In 2010 she was elected President of the UN Staff Association in Malawi. In January 2014 she resigned from UNFPA Sudan to concentrate on politics.

A member of the National Executive of the Malawi Congress Party, Lunguzi stood as the MCP parliamentary candidate for Dedza East in the 2014 Malawian general election. She was elected to parliament.

In June 2018 Lunguzi moved a motion to compel the government to fund the sitting of parliament in November and February, even in election years.

Lunguzi faced opposition in the November 2018 MCP primary elections for Dedza East. She was initially controversially declared to have lost the primaries to Patrick Bandawe, though 24 hours later the MCP declared her winner, citing procedural irrgularities. The dispute continued into the courts. In January 2019 the Malawian High Court stopped the MCP recognizing Lunguzi as having won the primaries. However, two weeks later, after her opponent Patrick Bandawe failed to commence a case against her, the court ruled in Lunguzi's favour.

In the 2019 Malawian general election Lunguzi lost her Dedza East seat to Patrick Bandawe, who stood against her as an independent. Bandawe received 11,694 votes, and Lunguzi came second with a tally of 8,746.

After her time as a legislator, Lunguzi returned to work for UNFPA.
