= Julianna Lisziewicz =

- Born: Budapest, Hungary
- Education: MSc Chemistry and Biology (Budapest University of Technology); PhD Molecular Biology (Max Planck Institute)
- Known for: Pioneering gene and antisense therapy for HIV/AIDS; DermaVir therapeutic vaccine; PolyPEPI™ and VERDI personalized vaccine platforms
- Scientific career
- Fields: Immunology, Molecular biology, Gene therapy, Cancer immunotherapy
- Workplaces: National Institutes of Health; Research Institute for Genetic and Human Therapy; Genetic Immunity; eMMUNITY (TREOS Bio); VERDI Solutions; Georgetown University

Julianna Lisziewicz is a Hungarian-German immunologist, molecular biologist, and biotechnology entrepreneur known for pioneering work in gene therapy, antisense therapy, and personalized immunotherapy for HIV/AIDS and cancer.

== Early life and education ==
Lisziewicz earned an MSc in Chemistry and Biology from the Budapest University of Technology and a PhD in Molecular Biology from the Max Planck Institute. She completed post-doctoral research at the Max Planck Institute for Experimental Medicine in Germany.

== Career ==
From 1989 to 1995 Lisziewicz worked at the U.S. National Institutes of Health (NIH), where she led the Antiviral Unit at the National Cancer Institute. During this period she co-invented one of the earliest gene-therapy approaches for HIV, developing the poly-TAR antisense construct—a genetic cassette that blocked transcription of the viral genome by targeting the trans-activation response (TAR) element. This invention, filed and patented by the NIH with Lisziewicz as inventor, was among the first demonstrations that antisense and gene therapy could inhibit HIV replication in human cells. In 1995 she founded the nonprofit Research Institute for Genetic and Human Therapy (RIGHT), integrating molecular virology and translational immunology. She subsequently founded Genetic Immunity Inc., which developed the DermaVir Patch, a dendritic-cell-targeted DNA vaccine for HIV. Her work gained international attention after publication of the New England Journal of Medicine report “Control of HIV despite the discontinuation of antiretroviral therapy” (N Engl J Med. 1999; 340(21):1683–1684), describing the Berlin Patient, the first documented case showing that the human immune system can control a chronic viral disease without continuous antiretroviral therapy. This discovery reshaped understanding of immune control and became a foundation for therapeutic vaccination strategies. Lisziewicz led the DermaVir program from discovery through full translational development, including preclinical studies in mice, pigs, rabbits, and monkeys, and Phase I and II clinical trials in HIV-infected patients. Her work demonstrated the feasibility, safety and preliminary efficacy of dendritic-cell-targeted nanomedicine as a therapeutic vaccination platform. She has extensive regulatory experience with both the U.S. FDA and the European Medicines Agency (EMA), enabling her to bring novel immunotherapeutic discoveries from concept to clinical testing. Lisziewicz later founded eMMUNITY LLC, a U.S. biotechnology company that evolved into TREOS Bio Ltd. (UK), which applies machine-learning-based epitope modeling to design PolyPEPI™ vaccines for colorectal and other solid cancers. She is currently the Founder and CEO of VERDI Solutions GmbH (Vienna, Austria), creator of the VERDI System (Vaccine Epitopes Ranked by Digital Intelligence)—a computational cloud platform integrating patient-specific HLA genotypes and tumor-antigen data to design personalized peptide vaccines.

== Research and scientific contributions ==
Lisziewicz’s research spans genetics, immune-system engineering, translational oncology, and vaccine development. At NIH she contributed to early antisense-oligonucleotide and gene-therapy studies for viral inhibition. At Genetic Immunity she led the full translational development of DermaVir, taking the therapeutic vaccine from bench discovery through preclinical animal models and into human clinical trials. The success of this program established a regulatory and translational framework later applied to cancer immunotherapy. In 2025 she and collaborators published a case report in Exploration of Immunology describing personalized VERDI peptide vaccines for metastatic signet ring cell carcinoma (SRCC), which elicited robust T-cell responses and prolonged survival. Her work established a continuous innovation pathway from immune control of chronic infection to personalized immunotherapy for cancer, highlighting her unique expertise in advancing laboratory discoveries into patient-ready treatments.

== Translational impact ==
Lisziewicz has been involved in the development of multiple therapeutic platforms—including gene therapy and nanomedicine to personalized peptide vaccines—from discovery to application in humans.

== Philosophy and vision ==
Lisziewicz has argued that conventional cancer care is “unsustainably expensive and fails to deliver the optimal chance for recovery.” Her mission is to personalize cancer therapy by optimizing the standard of care in combination with patient-specific immunotherapy, improving both efficacy and affordability.

== Selected patents ==
- US 5,837,533 — Gene therapy for HIV infection using poly-TAR antisense sequences (Assignee: U.S. Dept. of Health and Human Services; Inventor: Julianna Lisziewicz et al.).
- US 7,196,186 B2 — DNA composition and uses thereof (Assignee: Genetic Immunity Inc.).
- WO 2018/158455 A1 — Peptide vaccines (Assignee: TREOS Bio Ltd.).
- IL 320668 A — Personalized peptide vaccines and methods for treating cancer (Assignee: VERDI Solutions GmbH).

These patents trace Lisziewicz’s innovations from early gene therapy at the NIH through personalized peptide-vaccine design at VERDI Solutions.

== Companies founded ==
- Research Institute for Genetic and Human Therapy (RIGHT) – nonprofit research organization (1995)
- Genetic Immunity Inc. – developer of the DermaVir therapeutic vaccine (early 2000s)
- eMMUNITY LLC → TREOS Bio Ltd. – developer of the PolyPEPI™ precision-vaccine platform (2010s)
- VERDI Solutions GmbH – developer of the VERDI personalized cancer-vaccine platform (2020s)

== Academic and professional appointments ==
- Founder & CEO, VERDI Solutions GmbH
- Founder, eMMUNITY LLC (later TREOS Bio Ltd.)
- Founder, Genetic Immunity Inc.
- Founder, Research Institute for Genetic and Human Therapy (RIGHT)
- Adjunct Professor of Microbiology, Georgetown University (Washington, D.C.)
- Marie Curie Chair Professor, Semmelweis University (Budapest)
- Former Senior Investigator, National Cancer Institute (NIH)

== Selected publications ==
- Lisziewicz J, Lori F, et al. Control of HIV despite the discontinuation of antiretroviral therapy. The New England Journal of Medicine. 1999; 340(21):1683–1684.
- Lisziewicz J et al. Personalized peptide vaccines induce predicted T cell responses against signet ring cell carcinoma—a case report. Explor Immunol. 2025;5:1003221.

== Media ==
- Personalized Cancer Treatment (lang.:Hungarian)
- Semmelweis University · VII. évfolyam 07. szám · 2006. június 12.
- Anixa Biosciences Enters Letter of Intent with VERDI Solutions
- Biztonságos a magyar AIDS-elleni tapasz
