= Juliana Mialoundama =

French basketball player (born 1993)

Juliana Mialoundama (born March 18, 1993, in Angers) is a French basketball player who played for Arras PA of the Ligue Féminine de Basketball.
