= Ulyana Sergeenko =

Russian fashion designer (born 1979)

- Born: Ulyana Viktorovna Sergeenko; 30 August 1979 (age 46); Oskemen, Kazakh SSR, USSR
- Label: Ulyana Sergeenko
- Spouse: Danil Khachaturov (m. 2008; div. 2015)
- Children: 2
- Website: www.ulyanasergeenko.com

Ulyana Viktorovna Sergeenko (Russian: Ульяна Викторовна Сергеенко; born 30 August 1979) is a Kazakhstani and Russian fashion designer.

== Early life ==
Sergeenko was born into a family of linguists in Ust-Kamenogorsk, Kazakhstan, when it was still part of the USSR.

She studied in a specialized humanitarian school in Kazakhstan and then graduated the Faculty of Philology at the St. Petersburg State University.

Being always interested in fashion, Sergeenko decided to explore her interest by collecting various clothing items, she was often searching for the items, and she frequently visited flea-markets and vintage boutiques, as well as bidding on a major fashion auctions.

== Career ==
=== First Steps ===
Sergeenko became a client of Valentino, Givenchy, Jean Paul Gaultier, Chanel, and Dior. Noted for her style, she was dubbed part of the Russian Mafia by fashion bloggers alongside fellow Russians Miroslava Duma, Elena Perminova and Vika Gazinskaya. However Sergeenko grew frustrated when pieces she had collaborated with designers on showed up in their collections with no credit given to her contributions. As a result, Sergeenko launched her eponymous fashion label in 2011 in Russia.

=== Own Label ===
The Ulyana Sergeenko brand was launched in Moscow in April 2011 with a first collection designed for autumn-winter 2011–2012. After the first two collections shown in Moscow, the brand has received much media attention as well as buyer's and client's requests from all over the world. By now, the Moscow-based company produces ready-to-wear women's clothes, bags, fine jewellery and headpieces. Besides the retail stock, the Ulyana Sergeenko brand also has an atelier where clients could order made-to-measure versions of the runway items.

Sergeenko's first couture collection was warmly received with reviewers noting that her style was a blend of Russian military, literary and fairytale influences. Her debut collection featured clingy knit tops, quilted skirts, floor-sweeping greatcoats, and sable.

One key principle of Sergeenko's work is meticulous attention to detail and quality. Many hand-crafted elements, including stitching, knitting and embroidery, go into item production. All items are produced in Moscow under control of the designer. All fabrics and trimmings are bought in France, Italy or Japan and some garments have vintage details specifically picked at antique markets. Sergeenko has collaborated with skilled ateliers from Russia as well as numerous other craftsmen from former Soviet republics. Within the last five years, Sergeenko has worked with around seventy different ateliers and craftsmen including lace makers from Yelets, Vologda and Krestsy, including elements like Georgian calligraphy in some of her pieces.

=== Clients ===
Beyoncé appeared in one of her creations in her music video for "Haunted". Singer Lady Gaga, burlesque performer Dita von Teese, socialite Kim Kardashian and model Natalia Vodianova are also clients.

== Personal life ==
Sergeenko is divorced from Russian insurance billionaire Danil Khachaturov, general director and co-owner of Rosgosstrakh. She has 2 children: son Alexander (from a previous relationship) and daughter Vasilisa (with Khachaturov).

== Controversy ==
In 2018, Sergeenko's handwritten note to Miroslava Duma, which said "to my N***as in Paris", caused uproar in the fashion industry because of its content. She apologized, and said that she did not mean to cause offense.
