= Yulianna Beziazychna =

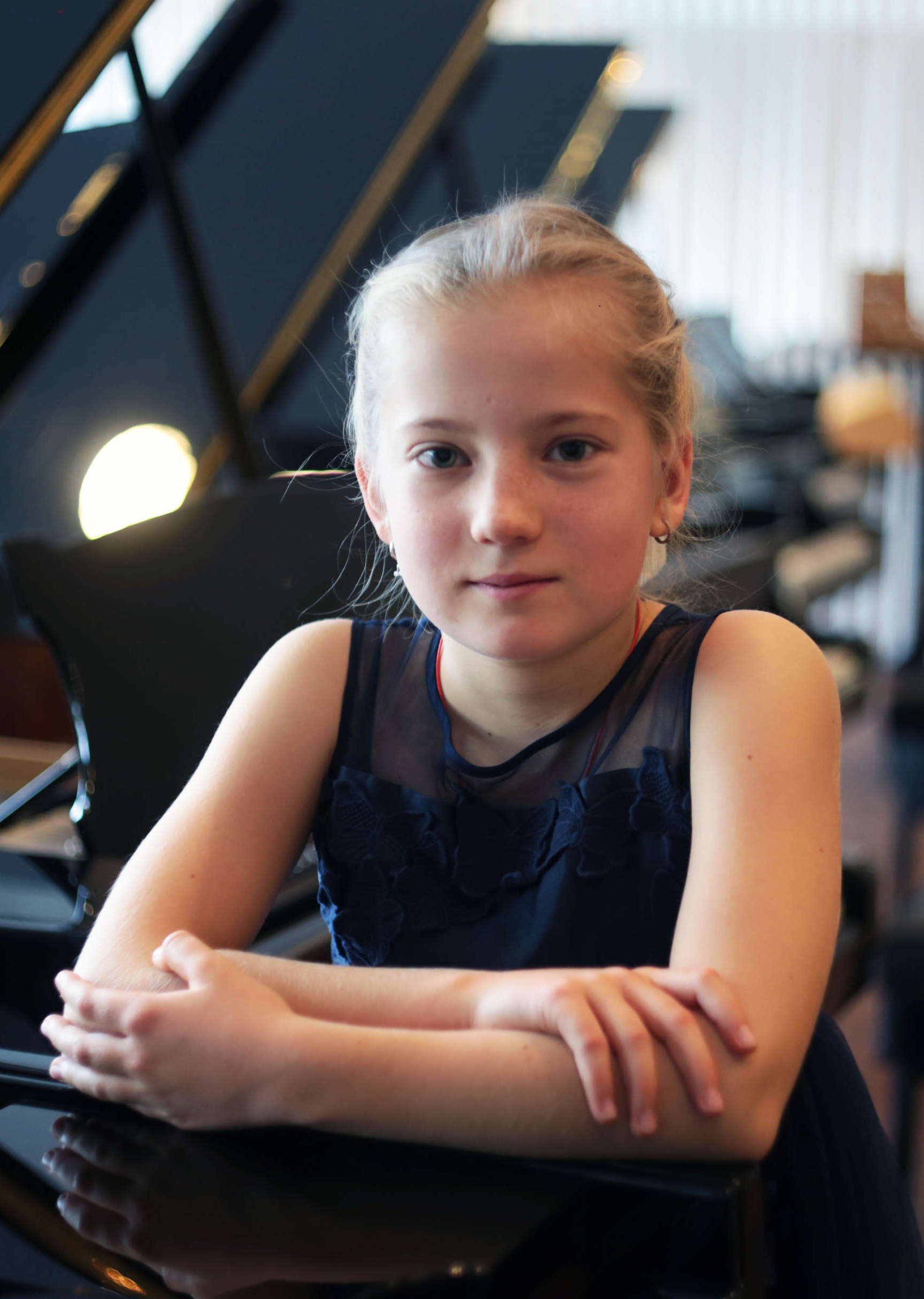
- Beziazychna in 2024

Background information
- Born: December 9, 2013 (age 12); Uman, Ukraine
- Origin: Ukrainian
- Genres: Classical music
- Occupation: Pianist
- Instrument: Piano

Yulianna Beziazychna (born 9 December 2013) is a Ukrainian–Dutch pianist. She is a prizewinner of international competitions in more than ten countries and has appeared at music festivals in the Netherlands, Germany, Switzerland, and Austria. Her performances have been broadcast on Dutch national radio NPO Klassiek and she has been featured in Dutch press including Trouw and De Gelderlander.

== Early life and education ==
Beziazychna was born in Uman, Ukraine. After moving to the Netherlands, she continued her musical education at the Davidsbündler Music Academy under the guidance of Tatiana Abaieva.

== Competitions ==
Beziazychna has won awards at numerous international piano competitions, among them:

- Concours International Piano Neuchâtel Val de Travers 2025 (Switzerland) – 1st prize
- 2nd International Piano Competition for Young Pianists Kronberg (Germany) 2025 – 2nd prize.
- 6th Fujairah International Piano Competition 2025 (UAE) – 2nd prize
- Toetsen – Liszt-Utrecht+UPF 2025 (The Netherlands) – finalist
- Steinway Pianoconcours (Netherlands, 2024) – First Prize, Public Prize, Grand Prix.
- 11th edition César Franck International Piano Competition 2023 (Kraainem, Belgium) – 1st prize
- Globe International Piano Competition2023 (The Netherlands) – 1st prize
- International Competition "Genève Musicale" (Switzerland, 2023) – First Prize, Public Prize, Special Prize Michel Runtz.
- XIV International Competition for Young Pianists in memory of Vladimir Krainev (Ukraine, 2020) – Third Prize.

== Festivals and performances ==
She has performed at several international festivals, including:

- Stiftfestival (Netherlands, 2025).
- International Steinway Festival (Laeiszhalle Hamburg, 2025), representing the Netherlands.
- Grachtenfestival (Amsterdam, 2024).
- Klassiek op het Amstelveld (Amsterdam, 2023–2024).
- Winteravonden aan de Amstel (Amsterdam, 2022).

== Media and recognition ==
Beziazychna has performed live three times on Dutch national radio NPO Klassiek. She also appeared on Dutch television in the program Podium Klassiek.

The regional newspaper De Gelderlander (2024) profiled her as a "piano wonder". The national daily Trouw (2025) highlighted her as one of the promising young piano talents in the Netherlands. She has also been mentioned in Het Parool in coverage of festivals and concerts.
