= Julienne (crater) =

Crater on the Moon

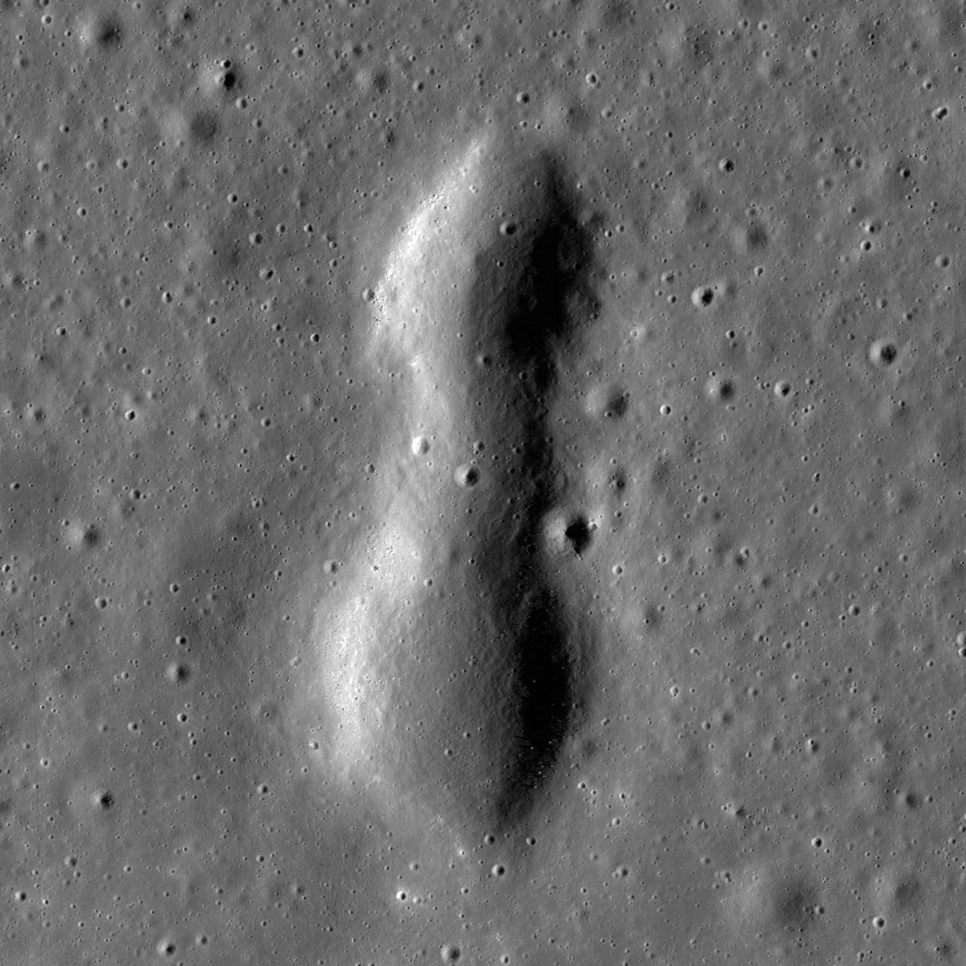
- Photo by LRO (width is 2.7 km)
- Coordinates: 26.06°N 3.13°E
- Diameter: 2.0×0.8 km
- Colongitude: 375° at sunrise
- Eponym: French feminine name

Julienne is a small, irregular depression that is located in Palus Putredinis (southeastern Mare Imbrium), in the terrain to the southeast of the prominent crater Archimedes, and about 12 km west of the landing site of Apollo 15 at Hadley Rille.

This is a dumbbell-shaped feature, with many smaller craters around it. The surface about this crater is marked by ray material from the crater Autolycus to the northeast. There are narrow clefts in the surface to the north and south of Julienne, and a hilly region to the west.

The feature is described as being of probable volcanic origin in the Apollo 15 Preliminary Science Report.

The feature name was officially adopted by the IAU in 1976, and refers to a French female given name.
