= Juliana Larena y Fenollé =

- Born: Juliana Josefa Benita Larena Fenollé; 16 February 1790; Ejea de los Caballeros, Spain
- Died: 1835 (aged 44–45); Zaragoza, Spain
- Known for: Heroism in the Sieges of Zaragoza

Juliana Josefa Benita Larena Fenollé (16 February 1790, Ejea de los Caballeros, Spain – 1835, Zaragoza, Spain) was a Spanish nurse involved in the Sieges of Zaragoza during the Peninsular War.

Larena moved to Zaragoza, Spain at a young age, and was 18 years old when General Lefebvre initiated the French army's first siege on the city in 1808. During the first siege, she worked as a nurse, tending to the wounded on the front line. During the second siege a year later, Larena helped to defend the stronghold located at Cathedral-Basilica of Our Lady of the Pillar, one of the most dangerous areas during the siege.

On 30 September 1808, General Palafox awarded her the Shield of Distinction (Spanish: el Escudo de Distinción) for her bravery and provided her a pension, which King Ferdinand VII confirmed on 25 October 1814.

Larena died of cholera in 1835, in Zaragoza. On the centenary of the first siege, a street in Zaragoza was renamed Calle Juliana Larena in her honor.
