= Juliana Emma Linter =

British conchologist (1844–1909)

- Born: 19 July 1844; Teignmouth
- Died: 30 August 1909; Twickenham
- Occupations: Conchologist, collector

Juliana Emma Linter (1844-1909) was a British conchologist and collector who donated the Linter collection to the Royal Albert Memorial Museum & Art Gallery.

== Early life ==
Juliana Emma Linter was born in Teignmouth on 19 July 1844 to parents William Brine Linter, a musician, and Caroline Mary Nicholls. She was the fourth of six children and her parents' only daughter.

As a young girl, Linter lived at 6 Saxe Street in Teignmouth until leaving for London to study. She was a regular reader at the British Museum for many years. The age at which she left her parents is unknown, but census records from 1871, when she was 26 years old, show she was not living with them in Teignmouth. As an adult, she first appears on the census in 1881, at 36 years old and residing in Grosvenor Road, Twickenham, London, where she is registered as a "biological student", though not formally enrolled in any college or university.

== Shell collection ==
Linter started collecting shell specimens in the 1880's. The core of Linter's initial collection came from William Theobald and also the collection of Colonel Skinner.

Linter was elected a member of the Malacological Society of London in 1895, though rarely attended meetings.

== Death ==
Following two years of ill health, Linter died on 30 August 1909.
