= Uliana Paletskaya =

Uliana Paletskaya (died 1569), was a Princess of Russia by marriage to Yuri of Uglich.

She was the daughter of Dmitry Paletsky. She married Yuri in 1547. They had a son. She was forced to become a nun when she was widowed, by her brother-in-law the czar. In 1569, she was drowned by order of the tsar.
