= Juliana Sokolová =

Slovak philosopher and writer

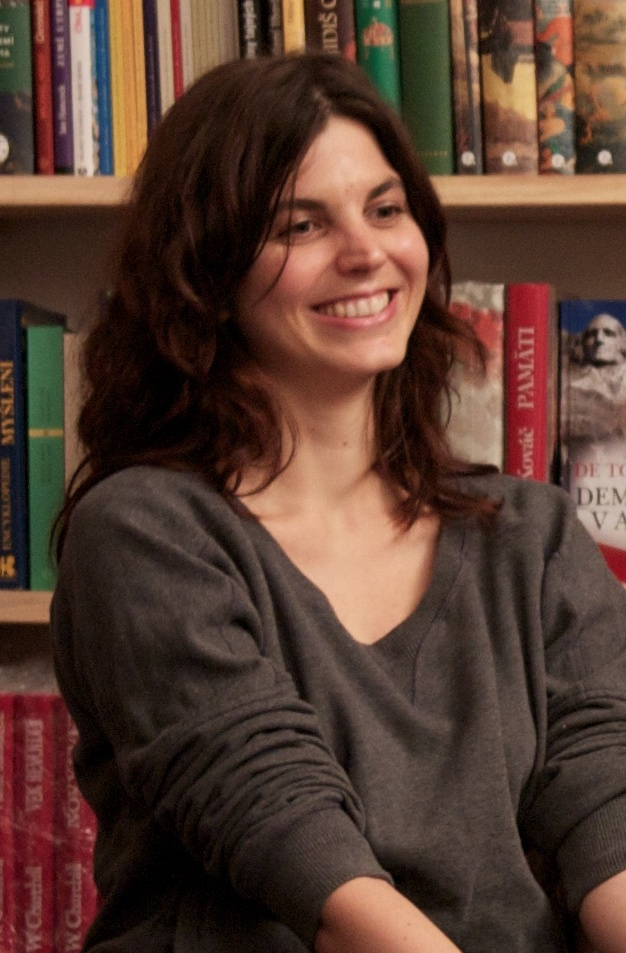
- Born: July 19, 1981 (age 45); Košice, Czechoslovakia (now Slovakia)
- Education: University of York
- Occupations: writer, poet and philosopher
- Spouse: Lukáš Berberich
- Children: 2
- Writing career
- Pen name: Juliana Sokolová Berbere
- Language: English, Slovak, Hungarian
- Genre: Poetry

Juliana Sokolová (born 19. júl 1981 in Košice) is a Slovak writer, poet and philosopher.

== Early life ==
Juliana Sokolová grew up in Košice and Misrata. She studied Philosophy at the University of York graduating in 2009. During her studies, she lived partly in the UK, partly in Kosovo and Sarajevo. Since 2010, she has taught Aesthetics at the Technical University of Košice.

== Works ==
Sokolová writes in English, Slovak and occasionally in Hungarian. In 2013, she published a book of poems written in English and translated to Slovak My House will have a Roof / Môj dom bude mať strechu.

She has been involved in transformation of the Úsmev cinema in Košice into an important cultural centre.
