= Julianne MacLean =

Canadian author

Julianne MacLean is a Canadian author of romance novels, primarily historical romance. She lives in Nova Scotia.

Maclean earned a bachelor's degree in English literature from the University of King's College in 1987. She went back to school to study accounting, and in 1992 received a degree in Business Administration with a major in accounting. She worked in the Office of the Auditor General before quitting to focus on writing her romance novels. She sold her first novel, Prairie Bride, to Harlequin in 1999.

In 2005, her novel Love According to Lily won the Romantic Times Reviewers' Choice Best Regency-Set Historical Romance Award.

== Bibliography ==
By publisher

=== Harlequin Historical ===
- Prairie Bride, 2000
- The Marshal and Mrs. O'Malley, 2001
- Adam's Promise, 2003

=== Silhouette Desire ===
- Sleeping with the Playboy, 2003

=== Avon/HarperCollins ===
==== American Heiress Series ====
1. To Marry the Duke, 2003
2. An Affair Most Wicked, 2004
3. My Own Private Hero, 2004
4. Love According to Lily, 2005
5. Portrait of a Lover, 2006
6. Surrender to a Scoundrel, 2007

==== Pembroke Palace Series ====
1. In My Wildest Fantasies, 2007
2. The Mistress Diaries, 2008
3. When a Stranger Loves Me, 2009
4. Married By Midnight, 2012
5. A Kiss Before the Wedding, 2012
6. Seduced at Sunset, 2013

=== St. Martin's Press ===
==== The Highlander Trilogy ====
1. Captured by the Highlander, 2011
2. Claimed by the Highlander, 2011
3. Seduced by the Highlander, 2011

==== The Royal Trilogy ====
1. Be My Prince, April 2012
2. Princess in Love, October 2012
3. The Prince's Bride, April 2013

=== Self-published ===
- The Color of Heaven (as E.V. Mitchell), 2011
- Taken by the Cowboy, 2011
- "The Rebel" (a short story prequel to the Highlander Trilogy), 2011
