= Juliana Machado Ferreira =

Brazilian scientist

- Born: São Paulo, Brazil
- Education: University of São Paulo
- Known for: Founder and executive director of Freeland Brasil

Juliana Machado Ferreira (São Paulo, 1980) is a Brazilian scientist, a conservation geneticist, and an activist against wildlife trafficking. She is a founding member and current executive director of Freeland Brasil (the South American branch of the Freeland Foundation), whose mission is "to conserve biodiversity by ending wildlife trafficking" through the combination of scientific research, education and awareness, and public policy. She is a TED Senior Fellow.

== Biography and early career ==
Juliana Machado Ferreira was born in São Paulo (Brazil). She completed a BSc Biological Sciences, MSc and PhD Biology (Genetics) at the University of São Paulo.

== Contributions ==
Juliana started as a TED Fellow in 2009 and later became a TED Senior Fellow. She collaborated with the U.S. Fish and Wildlife Service’s Forensics Laboratory from 2005 to 2013, was a 2014 National Geographic Emerging Explorer and received the 2016 WINGS Courage Award from the organization WINGS WorldQuest. Dr. Ferreira gave a 2010 TED talk focusing on the fight to end rare-animal trafficking in Brazil.

She founded and is Executive Director of Freeland Brasil, where she works on:

1. educational efforts and awareness action to diminish the demand for wild pets and products from wildlife,
2. giving support to the development of robust networks for international and regional law enforcement against wildlife trafficking, and
3. carrying out scientific research in order to develop tools for its employment for law enforcement.

In this way, she aims to establish an independent laboratory in Brazil for high quality forensic analyses on wildlife crime evidence for all South American countries.
