= Juliana Cunha =

Brazilian journalist, writer and university professor

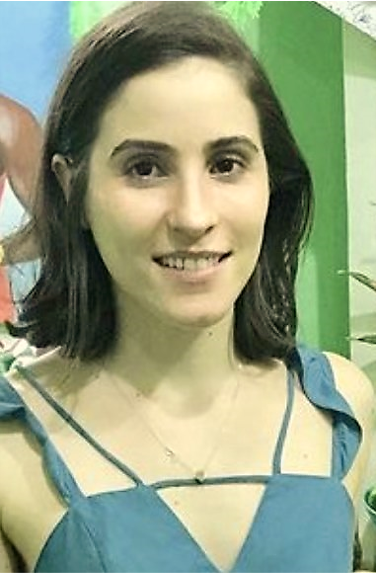
- Born: Juliana Silva Cunha de Mendonça; December 22, 1987 (age 38); Salvador, Bahia, Brazil
- Education: University of São Paulo
- Occupations: Journalist; researcher; university professor; writer
- Employer: Fundação Getúlio Vargas
- Notable work: Já matei por menos (2013)

Juliana Silva Cunha de Mendonça (born December 22, 1987) is a Brazilian journalist, writer, researcher, and university professor.

She is the author of the blog Já matei por menos, which became a book published by the independent publisher Lote 42 in 2013. She also translated Bernice Bobs Her Hair by F. Scott Fitzgerald for the same publisher in 2016.

== Biography ==
Juliana was born in the city of Salvador, in Bahia, in 1987. She initially enrolled in a Literature course in her hometown but later moved to São Paulo to continue her studies. She has worked as a journalist for various media outlets. Currently, she is a part-time professor at the School of International Relations of the Fundação Getúlio Vargas.

She teaches academic writing and reading strategies to first-semester students in a course called Oficinas Profissionais I: Comunicação e Expressão, and she also serves as one of the literature reviewers for the newspaper O Globo.

She is currently a Ph.D. candidate in Literature at the University of São Paulo, where she also completed her master's degree with a dissertation on the novel The Remains of the Day by Kazuo Ishiguro, under the guidance of Edu Otsuka. She is currently researching the novel Fogo Morto by José Lins do Rego, under the guidance of Ivone Daré Rabello. She also teaches literature and history in various free courses, such as at the Revista Cult space.

Alongside other translators, she is responsible for the Brazilian version of the book Catch and Kill by Ronan Farrow, published by Todavia in 2020, among other works.

== Published books ==
- Literaturas de Língua Portuguesa I [Portuguese Language Literatures I], with Bruna Guerra. 1st ed. Londrina: Editora e Distribuidora Educacional S.A., 2017. v. 1. 144p.
- Kimland (photo book), São Paulo: self-published, 2014. 70p.
- Já matei por menos [I've Killed for Less]. 1st ed. São Paulo: Lote 42, 2013. 200p.
- Gaveta de bolso [Pocket Drawer]. 1st ed. São Paulo: Prólogo, 2011. 120p.
