= Juliana Deguis =

Haitian-Dominican woman

Juliana Deguis Pierre
- Born: April 1, 1984 (age 41); Yamasá, Monte Plata, Dominican Republic
- Occupation: Housemaid
- Known for: Ruling 168
- Children: 4
- Parents: Blanco Deguis (father); Marie Pierre (mother)

Juliana Deguis Pierre (born April 1, 1984) is a Haitian-Dominican woman, who was the plaintiff in the landmark Dominican lawsuit against the civil registry authority of the Dominican Republic which in 2013 ruled that people born to illegal parents never had any right to the Dominican nationality by birth. Deguis applied to the Special Naturalization Amnesty (Law 169-14) and on August 1, 2014 she acquired the Dominican nationality.

== Early years ==
Juliana Dequis Pierre was born in the Dominican Republic in the batey of Los Jovillos, municipality of Yamasá, Monte Plata province, on 1 April 1984 to a Haitian father (Blanco Deguis) and mother (Marie Pierre) who settled in the Dominican Republic in the 1970s.

== Struggle for Dominican nationality ==
In 2008, she went to the identification office with her birth certificate to request a Cédula de Identidad y Electoral, an Identification card. That ID card also serves as voter.s registration card. The officers seized her birth certificate and refused to issue her the requested document. The reason given for the rejection was that she had Haitian surnames. She appealed before the Civil and Commercial Court of the First Instance of the Judicial District of Monte Plata. She was rejected. The court justified rejecting her appeal on the basis that she did not supply the original version of her birth certificate but provided photocopies instead. She then appealed to the highest judicial instance in the Dominican Republic. The Constitutional Court.

== The Sweeping Order of the Constitutional Court Against Her and Dominicans in her Category ==
The Constitutional Court acknowledged that the proper venue for her appeal should have been the administrative grievances court but decided to hear the case anyway for the sake of |expediency". That court also denied her case but, in addition, recommended dramatic actions to be taken with regards to the status of all individuals who fit her profile in the country. The decision was issued in a 147-page document which contained the two dissenting votes from the 13-member body. The decision can be summarized in 10 points as follows:

1. The court accepted the form of the appeal
2. The court revoked the judgment of the Civil and Commercial Court of the First Instance of the Judicial District of Monte Plata but found against the plaintiff Juliana Dequis Pierre on the basis that she was born of aliens who were "in transit" in reference to Article 11.1 of the Constitution of 29 November 29, 1966 in force at the time of her birth
3. The court ordered the Central Electoral Junta to submit the birth certificate of Juliana to a competent court able to determine its validity or invalidity and to extend this measure to all similar cases
4. The court ordered the Immigration authorities to grant a temporary residence to Juliana until the implementation of the national plan for the regularization of illegal aliens in the Dominican Republic
5. The court directed the Central Electoral Junta to conduct a thorough audit of the civil records within a year starting from June 21, 1929, to expunge the civil records of people who are illegally recorded therein through April 18, 2007 and record these "aliens" onto another register; to develop within 90 days the national plan for the regularization of illegal aliens
6. The court exhorted the government to implement the plan for the regularization of illegal aliens
7. The court directed the Central Electoral Junta to turn the list of aliens illegally registered in the civil registry over to the Ministry of Interior and Police
8. The court ordered the notification of the decision to all the concerned parties
9. The court declared that the decision did not incur any unpaid expenditures
10. The court ordered the publication of the decision in the court's bulletin
