= Juliana Sorelli =

French film maker and designer

- Born: 1988 or 1989; Paris, France
- Occupations: Designer; filmmaker; curator
- Years active: 2012-present
- Website: sorellipresents.com

Juliana "Juju" Sorelli is a Los Angeles-based French filmmaker, designer and curator.

Sorelli moved to Los Angeles in 2008. Her first film, Strange Strangers, was released in 2012. It featured Riley Keough, who also starred in Sorelli's short, Madame Le Chat, which premiered at the Marfa Film Festival in 2014.

In 2013 she founded a production company, Sorelli Presents, and opened a gallery and boutique in Hollywood. It became known as The Evil Rock N Roll Cat based on a drawing of an electrified cat that appeared on the building's exterior. LA's "most cultishly cool store", it appeared on the GQ list of the Coolest Off-the-Beaten-Path stores in America. Sorelli curated art installations at The Evil Rock N Roll Cat, including After the Boom, a collection of Donna Santisi's photos of women in the 1970s LA rock scene, and The Runaways, an exhibit of Runaways memorabilia and Brad Elterman's original photos of the band. The Runaways was also shown at the Poppington Gallery in New York in 2015.

In 2014 Sorelli founded Hollywood Savage Society, a unisex clothing line inspired by punk and 1970s rock and roll. She said in a 2017 interview that she started Hollywood Savage Society because she couldn't find clothing she wanted to wear.
