= Julianna Pacheco =

Puerto Rican footballer

Personal information
- Full name: Julianna Alba Pacheco Torres
- Date of birth: June 28, 2002 (age 24)
- Place of birth: San Antonio, Texas, United States
- Height: 5 ft 2 in (1.58 m)
- Position: Midfielder

Senior career*
| Years | Team | Apps | (Gls) |
| 2021–2022 | Santos Laguna | 8 | (0) |

International career^{‡}
| 2021– | Puerto Rico | 1 | (0) |
- * Club domestic league appearances and goals as of October 17, 2021 ‡ National team caps and goals as of October 23, 2021

Julianna Alba Pacheco Torres (born June 28, 2002) is a Puerto Rican footballer who plays as a midfielder for the Puerto Rico women's national team.

== Early life ==
Pacheco was born in San Antonio, Texas to an American father and a Puerto Rican mother. Her paternal grandparents were also born in Puerto Rico.

== Club career ==
Pacheco has played for Santos Laguna in Mexico.

== International career ==
Pacheco made her senior debut for Puerto Rico at senior level on October 23, 2021, in a 2–1 friendly home win over Guyana.
