= Juliana Santos =

Juliana Santos may refer to:

- Juliana Paula dos Santos (born 1983), Brazilian middle-distance runner
- Juliana Chaves Santos (born 1990), Brazilian gymnast
- Juliana dos Santos (birth date unknown c. 1985) East Timorese sex trafficking victim
