= Berlin Art Week =

Multi-day art event in Berlin

Berlin Art Week is a 6-day cultural event that takes place in Berlin, Germany once a year in the fall and is organised by Kulturprojekte Berlin GmbH. Berlin Art Week showcases contemporary art from all over the world, through events, exhibition openings, artist films and art fairs, spanning approximately 50 institutions, including established museums such as the Hamburger Bahnhof (contemporary art museum – Museum für Gegenwart) as well as a great number of independent galleries.

== Background ==
Berlin Art Week was founded in 2012 as successor of the art forum – an internationally known art fair – that had existed from 1996 until 2011. Berlin Art Week has established its reputation as the yearly key event for contemporary art in Berlin combining “exhibitions, art fairs, art awards, and an auxiliary programme featuring talks, films, and tours. In addition, Berlin Art Week provides new, surprising insights into private collections, project spaces, and the city’s sites of artistic production.”

At the heart of the Art Week are two fairs: abc – art berlin contemporary – founded in 2008, and Positions Berlin – Art Fair founded in 2014. The abc fair was founded by 9 Berlin galleries and pursues a concept different from typical art fairs. abc wants to break with the traditional art fair approach, where each gallery has their separate booth. Instead abc provides larger open spaces that can be used by the presenting galleries to display anything from paintings or drawings to sculptures and installations. Galleries usually only present works by one artist, ideally a new production. The idea behind this is to create a coherent exhibition, fostering a dialogue, rather than present an eclectic collection of art pieces, presented separately and without a narrative. Positions Berlin on the other hand follows a more traditional approach providing separate booths to a multitude of national and international galleries.

The goal of the Berlin Art Week is to further grow Berlin as an art hub that attracts artists, gallery owners, and collectors from all over the world. Berlin Art Week is sponsored by the Senate of Berlin.

== Berlin Art Week 2016 ==
The Berlin Art Week 2016 was the 5th Berlin Art Week and took place between September 13 and 18th. Similar to previous years, the Art Week attracted more than 100,000 visitors in 2016. However, there has been some speculation about a crisis of the Berlin Art Week and particularly its fairs: the abc reduced its showroom capacity in 2016 and only presented 62 galleries – instead of 100 as was originally advertised on the Art Week website still at the beginning of September. Positions Berlin presented 74 galleries, keeping the number of galleries roughly constant. The next Berlin Art Week is scheduled for 12–17 September 2017.
