= Juliana Sakae =

Brazilian journalist and filmmaker

- Occupations: Filmmaker; journalist

Juliana Sakae is a Brazilian journalist and filmmaker whose work focuses on social issues documentaries, human rights and children. Her first film, Bleu et Rouge, tells the story of Haiti through the eyes of seven Haitian teenagers, and was filmed the summer before the 2010 Haiti earthquake. Bleu et Rouge screened in several festivals in Brazil and it also was used to raise funds for Haitian earthquake victims.

Sakae's documentary, Antigirl, about a street artist won the Best Short Doc at the Los Angeles Film and Script Festival and was selected at the Female Eye Film Festival in Toronto.

== Filmography ==
- The Secret of Sound Design (Producer, 2016)
- Love Addiction (Producer, 2016)
- Lola Divas (Producer, 2015)
- Living in Noisy Life (Producer, 2015)
- Learning to Share (Editor, 2015)
- Antigirl (Director, 2014)
- Love Bid (Producer, 2014)
- Gev (Director, 2014)
- Aftermath (Director, 2013)
- Nino (Director, 2013)
- Paredes Pentads (Producer, 2010 / Brazil)
- Bleu et Rouge (Director, 2010)

== Honors and awards ==
- Los Angeles Film and Script Festival: Best Short Documentary: "Antigirl"
- RBS Awards 2011: Best Creative Project: "Laguna's Conquest told on Twitter"
- RBS Awards 2011: Innovative Journalist
- Official Selection 2015 Female Eye Film Festival
- Official Selection 2011 Mostra Internacional Etnografica
- Official Selection 2011 Catavideo
- Official Selection 2010 Cinesul
- Official Selection 2010 Cinedocumenta
