= Julien (given name) =

- Pronunciation: French: [ʒyljɛ̃]
- Gender: Male, (in English) rarely female

Origin
- Languages: 1. Greek; 2. Latin
- Meaning: 1. "downy-bearded" 2. "devoted to Jove"

Other names
- Related names: Julian, Jules, Julie, Julius, Julio, Julia, Jolyon

The given name Julien may refer to:

- Julien Abraham (born 1976), French film director and screenwriter
- Julien Absalon (born 1980), a French cross-country mountain biker
- Julien Airoldi (1900–1974), French politician
- Julien Aklei (born 1975), American singer songwriter
- Julien Alfred (born 2001), Saint Lucian sprinter
- Julien Alvard (1916–1974), a French art critic
- Julien Amegandjin (born 1940), Togolese academic
- Julien Andlauer (born 1999), French racing driver
- Julien Anfruns (living), a French Director General of the International Council of Museums since 2008
- Julien Antomarchi (born 1984), French cyclist
- Julien Anziani (born 1999), French professional footballer
- Julien Arias (born 1983), a French rugby union player
- Julien Arpels (1884–1964), French businessman
- Julien Aubert (born 1978), French politician
- Julien Audy (born 1984), French rugby union player
- Julien Bahain (born 1986), a French rower
- Julien Bailleul (1988–2011), a French football player
- Julien Baker (born 1995), an American singer, songwriter, and guitarist
- Julien Balbo (born 1979), a French professional squash player
- Julien Balkany (born 1981), a French businessman
- Julien Barbier (1869–1940), French architect
- Julien Bardy (born 1985), a French-born Portuguese rugby union player
- Julien Bargeton (born 1973), French politician
- Julien Baudet (born 1979), a French former football player and current manager
- Julien Bayou (born 1980), French activist and politician
- Julien Bègue (born 1993), French footballer
- Julien Beke (1914–1992), Belgian wrestler
- Julien Belgy (born 1983), a French professional road bicycle racer
- Julien Benda (1867–1956), a French philosopher and novelist
- Julien Benhaim (born 1996), French footballer
- Julien Benneteau (born 1981), a French professional tennis player
- Julien Bérard (born 1987), a French professional road bicycle racer
- Julien Berger (born 1990), a Belgian rugby union player
- Julien Bernard (born 1992), French cyclist
- Julien Berol (born 2001), French swimmer
- Julien Bertheau (1910–1995), a French actor
- Julien Berthier, a French artist
- Julien Berthomier (born 1990), a French football player
- Julien Bessières (1777–1840), a French scientist
- Julien Bill (born 1983), Swiss motorcycle racer
- Julien Billaut (born 1981), a French slalom canoer
- Julien Binford (1909–1997), an American painter
- Julien Blanc (born 1988), Swiss-born motivational speaker
- Julien Bmjizzo (born 1994), Rwandan music director
- Julien Bogaert (1924–2018), Belgian canoeist
- Julien Bogousslavsky (born 1954), Swiss neurologist
- Julien Boisselier (born 1970), a French actor
- Julien Bonetat (born 1971), French squash player
- Julien Bonnaire (born 1978), a French rugby union player
- Julien Bontemps (born 1979), a French sailor
- Julien Bonvin (born 1999), Swiss hurdler and sprinter
- Julien Borowczyk (born 1979), French politician
- Julien Bos, French handball player
- Julien Boutter (born 1974), a French former professional tennis player
- Julien Boyer (born 1998), French footballer
- Julien Brellier (born 1982), a French football player
- Julien Brouillette (born 1986), a Canadian professional ice hockey player
- Julien Brugnaut (born 1981), a rugby union player
- Julien Brulé (1875-after 1920), a French archer who competed in the 1920 Summer Olympics
- Julien Bryan (1899–1974), an American photographer and film maker
- Julien Buge, French footballer
- Julien Cagnina (born 1994), Belgian tennis player
- Julien Cahn (1882–1944), an entrepreneur and philanthropist
- Julien Cain (1887–1974), the general administrator of the Bibliothèque nationale de France before the Nazi occupation
- Julien Canal (born 1982), a French racing driver
- Julien Candelon (born 1980), a French professional rugby player
- Julien Cardy (born 1981), a French football player
- Julien Carette (1897–1966), a French film actor
- Julien Carraggi, Belgian badminton player
- Julien Cartron (born 1989), a French Grand Prix motorcycle racer
- Julien Casoli (born 1982), a French Paralympian athlete
- Julien Castellini (born 1975), Monegasque alpine skier
- Julien Caussé (1869–1938), French sculptor
- Julien Célestine (born 1997), French footballer
- Julien Cétout (born 1988), a French professional football player
- Julien Chaisse (born 1976), professor of law at the City University of Hong Kong
- Julien Charlet, French curler and coach
- Julien Chauvin, French tennis player
- Julien Chouinard (1929–1987), a Canadian lawyer and civil servant
- Julien Civange (living), a French musician, composer, lyricist and producer
- Julien Clerc (born 1947), a French singer
- Julien Columeau (born 1972), French novelist
- Julien Cools (born 1947), a Belgian football player
- Julien Cordonnier (born 1980), a French professional football player
- Julien Cosmao (1761–1825), a French Navy officer and admiral
- Julien Coupat (born 1974), a French political activist
- Julien Courbet (born 1965), French journalist and presenter
- Julien Courbey (born 1976), a French actor
- Julien Cousineau (born 1981), a Canadian alpine skier
- Julien Creuzet, French artist
- Julien Crickx (1894–?), Belgian rower
- Julien Cuaz, French tennis player
- Julien Dacosta (born 1996), French footballer
- Julien Darui (1916–1987), a French football player
- Julién Davenport (born 1995), American football player
- Julien Davies Cornell (1910–1994), an American lawyer
- Julien Davignon (1854–1916), Belgian politician
- Julien de Lallande Poydras (1746–1824), a French-American politician
- Julien Delannoy (born 1995), French rugby union player
- Julien Delaplane, tennis player
- Julien Delbecque (1903–1977), Belgian cyclist
- Julien Delbouis (born 1998), French rugby union player
- Julien Delétraz (born 1985), French footballer
- Julien Delocht (born 1942), Belgian cyclist
- Julien Delonglée (born 1983), a French professional football player
- Julien P. Delphey (1917–2009), American politician from Maryland
- Julien de Mallian (1805–1851), French playwright
- Julien Denormandie (born 1980), French politician
- Julien Depuychaffray (1907–1942), French wrestler
- Julien De Sart (born 1994), Belgian footballer
- Julien De Smedt (born 1975), a Belgian-Danish architect
- Julien Desprès (born 1983), a French rower
- Julien Desrosiers (born 1980), an ice hockey player
- Julien De Wilde (born 1944), a Belgian businessman
- Julien Dillens (1849–1904), a Belgian sculptor
- Julien Dive (born 1985), French politician
- Julien Dobbelaere (1921–?), Belgian wrestler
- Julien Doré (born 1982), a French singer
- Julien d'Ortoli (born 1983), French sailor
- Julien Dray (born 1955), a member of the National Assembly of France
- Julien Dubuque (1762–1810), a French Canadian settler
- Julien Dufau (1888–1916), French rugby union player
- Julien Duguay (born 1992), Canadian jeweler
- Julien Dumora (born 1988), French professional rugby union player
- Julien Dunkley (born 1975), a Jamaican track and field athlete
- Julien Dupré (1851–1910), a French painter
- Julien Dupuy (born 1983), a French rugby union player
- Julien Durand (footballer) (born 1983), French association footballer
- Julien Durand (politician) (1874–1973), French politician
- Julien Duranville (born 2006), Belgian footballer
- Julien du Rhéart (1885–1963), French footballer
- Julien Duval (born 1990), French cyclist
- Julien Duvivier (1896–1967), French film director
- Julien Ebah (born 1990), Cameroonian footballer
- Julien Edwards (born 1988), Guyanese former footballer
- Julien El Fares (born 1985), French road bicycle racer
- Julien Epaillard, French show jumping rider
- Julien Escudé (born 1979), French football player
- Julien Fabri (born 1994), French footballer
- Julien Falchero (born 1997), French racing driver
- Julien Falk (1902–1987), French composer
- Julien Faubert (born 1983), French football player
- Julien Faussurier (born 1987), French football player
- Julien Favier (born 1980), French professional football player
- Julien Fédon (1750–1796), leader of slave revolt in Grenada
- Julien Félix, French early aviator
- Julien Féret (born 1982), a French football player
- Julien Fernandes (born 1985), a French-Portuguese football player
- Julien Fivaz (born 1979), a Swiss long jumper
- Julien Forêt (born 1982), a French professional golfer
- Julien Foucaud (1847–1904), French botanist
- Julien Fouchard (born 1986), French cyclist
- Julien Fountain (born 1970), an English professional cricket coach
- Julien Fournié (living), a French fashion designer
- Julien François (born 1979), a French football player
- Julien Freund (1921–1993), French sociologist and philosopher
- Julien Friedler (1950–2022), a Belgian writer and contemporary artist
- Julien Frier (born 1974), a French rugby union player
- Julien Fritz (born 1990), French rugby player
- Julien Galipeau (born 1981), Canadian weightlifter
- Julien Garnier (1642–1730), a French Jesuit missionary to Canada
- Julien Gauthier (born 1997), Canadian ice hockey player
- Julien Genre, Italian male curler
- Julien Gerbi (born 1985), a French-Algerian race car driver
- Julien Ghyoros (1922–1978), Belgian composer and conductor
- Julien Gibert (disambiguation)
- Julien Giovannetti (1914–1966), French operatic baritone
- Julien Girard (born 1984), a French professional football player
- Julien Gobaux (born 1990), French artistic gymnast
- Julien Goekint (1929–2023), Belgian politician
- Julien Gorius (born 1985), a French football player
- Julien Gouyet (1828–1899), a French priest who discovered what is claimed as the House of the Virgin Mary
- Julien Gracq (1910–2007), a French writer
- Julien Green (1900–1998), an American writer
- Julien Grondin, French teqball player and former footballer
- Julien Grujon (1904–1976), French cyclist
- Julien Guadet (1834–1908), a French architect
- Julien Guay (born 1986), French cyclist
- Julien Guerrier (born 1985), a French professional golfer
- Julien Guertiau (1885–1954), a French flying ace during World War I
- Julien Guiomar (1928–2010), a French film director
- Julien Gunn (1877–1948), American politician
- Julien Haelterman (born 1940), Belgian cyclist
- Julien Havet (1853–1893), a French historian
- Julien Hébert (1917–1994), a Québécois industrial designer
- Julien Henx (born 1995), Luxembourgish swimmer
- Julien Hill (1877–1943), American football coach
- Julien Hoferlin (1966–2016), Belgian tennis coach
- Julien Hoffman (1925–2020), a South African-American pediatric cardiologist
- Julien Hoffmann (1924–2007), a Luxembourgian composer and professor of music
- Julien Hornuss (born 1986), a French football player
- Julien Hudson (1811–1844), a free man of color who lived in New Orleans, United States
- Julien Humbert (born 1984), a French football player
- Julien Ictoi (born 1978), a French football player
- Julien Ielsch (born 1983), a French professional football player
- Julien Ingrassia (born 1979), a French rally co-driver
- Julien Jabre (born 1976), French-Lebanese electronic music composer, producer and audio engineer
- Julien Jahier (born 1980), French footballer
- Julien Jeanpierre (born 1980), a French former professional tennis player
- Julien Josephson (1881–1959), an American motion picture screenwriter
- Julien Jousse (born 1986), a French professional racing driver
- Julien Kapek (born 1979), a French triple jumper
- Julien Kerneur (born 1991), a French professional kite surfer
- Julien Klener (born 1939), a Belgian linguist
- Julien Lachuer (born 1976), a French football player
- Julien Laharrague (born 1978), a French rugby union player
- Julien Lahaut (1884–1950), a Belgian politician
- Julien Laubscher (born 1987), a South African pop artist
- Julien Le Blant (1851–1936), a French painter of military subjects
- Julien J. LeBourgeois (1923–2012), a retired vice admiral of the United States Navy
- Julien Leclercq (1865–1901), a French poet and art critic
- Julien Leparoux (born 1983), a Champion jockey
- Julien Lepers (born 1949), a French television and radio host
- Julien Le Roy (1686–1759), a Parisian clockmaker and watchmaker
- Julien Levy (1906–1981), an art dealer in New York City, United States
- Julien Lizeroux (born 1979), a French World Cup alpine ski racer
- Julien Lootens (1876–1942), a Belgian cyclist
- Julien Loubet (born 1985), a French professional road bicycle racer
- Julien Lorcy (born 1972), a professional boxer
- Julien Loriot (1633–1715), a French theologian
- Julien Lorthioir (born 1983), a French professional football player
- Julien Lourau (born 1970), a French jazz saxophonist
- Julien Lowe, a fictional character in the television drama series The Shield
- Julien Loy (born 1976), a French triathlete
- Julien Lutz (born 1975), a Canadian music video director
- Julien Macdonald (born 1971), a Welsh fashion designer
- Julien Magnat (living), a French film and television screenwriter and director
- Julien Maitron (1881–1972), a French professional road bicycle racer
- Julien Malzieu (born 1983), a French rugby union and sevens player
- Julien Martinelli (born 1980), a French football player
- Julien Maurin (living), a French rally driver
- Julien Maury (born 1978), a French filmmaker
- Julien Mayfair, a fictional character in Anne Rice 's Mayfair Witches trilogy
- Julien Mazet (born 1981), a French professional road bicycle racer
- Julien Médecin (1894-?), a Monegasque architect
- Julien Michaud (born 1979), a French para table tennis player
- Julien Moineau (1903–1980), a French professional road bicycle racer
- Julien J. Monette, American politician
- Julien Mory Sidibé (1927–2003), a bishop of Mali
- Julien Musafia, an American musicologist
- Julien N'Da (born 1985), an Ivorian football player
- Julien Nitzberg (born 1966), an American film director, script writer and theatre director
- Julien Offray de La Mettrie (1709–1751), French physician and philosopher
- Julien of Toulouse (1750–1828), French deputy to the National Convention
- Julien Origas (1920–1983), French esotericist
- Julien Outrebon (born 1983), French professional football player
- Julien Paluku Kahongya (born 1968), politician of the Democratic Republic of the Congo
- Julien Peridier (1882–1967), a French electrical engineer and amateur astronomer
- Julien Perrichon (1566 – c. 1600), a French composer and lutenist of the late Renaissance
- Julien Perrin (born 1985), a French professional football player
- Julien Peyrelongue (born 1981), a French rugby union player
- Julien Pierre (born 1981), a French rugby union player
- Julien Pillet (born 1977), a French sabre fencer
- Julien Poueys (born 1979), a French football player
- Julien Poulin (born 1946), a Canadian actor, film director, screenwriter, film producer and composer
- Julien J. Proskauer, American magician
- Julien Prosser (born 1972), an Australian beach volleyball player
- Julien Puricelli (born 1981), a French rugby union player
- Julien Quercia (born 1986), a French football player
- Julien Quesne (born 1980), a French professional golfer
- Julien Raimond (1744–1801), an indigo planter in the French colony of Saint-Domingue
- Julien Rantier (born 1983), a French football player
- Julien Rassam (1968–2002), a French actor
- Julien de Ravalet (1582–1603), French man executed for committing incest
- Julien Reverchon (1837–1905), a French botanist
- Julien Ribaudo (born 1987), Belgian politician
- Julien Ries (1920–2013), a Belgian religious historian
- Julien Rinaldi (born 1979), a French rugby league player
- Julien Robert (born 1974), a French biathlete
- Julien Rodriguez (born 1978), a French professional football player
- Julien Sablé (born 1980), a French football player
- Julien Saubade (born 1983), a French rugby union player
- Julien Schepens (1935–2006), a Belgian former professional road bicycle racer
- Julien Senderos (born 1980), a Swiss basketball player
- Julien Simon (born 1985), a French road bicycle racer
- Julien Sicot (born 1978), a French Olympic freestyle swimmer
- Julien Sola (born 1984), a French professional football player
- Julien Sprunger (born 1986), a Swiss professional ice hockey player
- Julien Stevens (born 1943), a Belgian retired cyclist
- Julien Temple (born 1952), an English film, documentary and music video director
- Julien Tiersot (1857–1936), a French musicologist and composer
- Julien Tomas (born 1985), a French rugby union player
- Julien Torma (1902–1933), a French writer, playwright and poet
- Julien Toudic (born 1985), a French football player
- Julien Tournut (born 1982), a French football player
- Julien Touxagas (born 1984), a professional rugby league footballer
- Julien Uyttendaele (born 1991), Belgian politician
- Julien Valero (born 1984), a French-Spanish football player
- Julien Vanzeebroeck (born 1946), a Belgian Grand Prix motorcycle road racer
- Julien Varlet (born 1977), a French former professional tennis player
- Julien Vauclair (born 1979), a Swiss professional ice hockey player
- Julien Viale (born 1982), a French football player
- Julien Viaud (1850–1923), a French novelist and naval officer
- Julien Vidot (born 1982), a French racing driver
- Julien Vermote (born 1989), a Belgian professional cyclist
- Julien Vervaecke (1899–1940), a Belgian professional road bicycle racer
- Julien Wartelle (1889–1943), a French gymnast
- Julien Jalâl Eddine Weiss (1953–2015), French musician
- Julien Wiener (born 1955), an Australian former cricket player
- Julien Alexandre Achard de Bonvouloir (1749–1783), French envoy
- Julien Augustin Joseph Mermet (1772–1837), a French general who fought in the Napoleonic Wars
- Julien-Désiré Schmaltz (1771–1826), a French colonial administrator
- Julien Edmund Victor Gaujot (1874–1938), an American Army Medal of Honor recipient
- Julien François Desjardins (1799–1840), a French zoologist
- Julien Gustave Gagliardini (1846–1927), French painter
- Julien Joseph Audette (1914–1986), Canadian aviator
- Julien Joseph Vesque (1848–1895), a French naturalist
- Julien Léon Loizillon (1829–1899), a French general
- Julien Louis Geoffroy (1743–1814), a French literary critic
- Julien Noël Costantin (1857–1936), a French botanist and mycologist
- Julien Paul Blitz (1885–1951), an American cellist, conductor and teacher
- Algirdas Julien Greimas (1917–1992), a French semiotician
- André Julien Chainat (1892–1961), a French World War I flying ace
- Charles Julien Brianchon (1783–1864), a French mathematician and chemist
- Gabriel-Julien Ouvrard (1770–1846), a French financier
- Jean Baptiste Julien d'Omalius d'Halloy (1783–1875), a Belgian geologist
- Louis Julien Demers (1848–1905), a merchant and political figure in Quebec
- Luc-Julien-Joseph Casabianca (1762–1798), a French Navy officer
- Maxime Julien Émeriau de Beauverger (1762–1845), a French Navy officer and admiral

== Fictional characters ==
- Dr. Julien, a character in Ninjago
- King Julien, a character in Madagascar
- Julien Jourdain, DC Comics character also known as Circuit Breaker

== See also ==
- Julie (given name)
- Jean-Julien (given name)
- Julien-Joseph (given name)
- Pierre-Julien (given name)
