= Julio =

Julio is the Spanish equivalent of the month July and may refer to:

- Julio (given name)
- Julio (surname)
- Júlio de Castilhos, a municipality of the western part of the state of Rio Grande do Sul, Brazil
- Julio (album), a 1983 compilation album by Julio Iglesias
- Julio, a character in Romiette and Julio by Sharon M. Draper

== Other ==
- Don Julio, a brand of tequila produced in Mexico
- Hurricane Julio, a list of storms named Julio
- Jules
- Julie-O, musical work for solo cello by Mark Summer
- Julio 204 or JULIO 204, one of the first graffiti writers in New York City
- Julio-Claudian dynasty, the first five Roman Emperors: Augustus, Tiberius, Caligula (also known as Gaius), Claudius, and Nero
- Julius (disambiguation)
