= Favier =

Favier may refer to:

- Jean-Louis Favier (1711–1784)
- Pierre-Marie-Alphonse Favier (1837–1905) was a French missionary to China
- Jean-Jacques Favier (born 1949), a French engineer and astronaut
- Amanda Favier (born 1979)
- Denis Favier (born 1959)
- Efigenio Favier (born 1959)
- Jean Favier (1932–2014)
- John Favier (born 1960)
- Julien Favier (born 1980)
- Lucie Favier (1932–2003)
- Matt Favier (born 1965)
- Sophie Favier (born 1963), French actress
