= Jules =

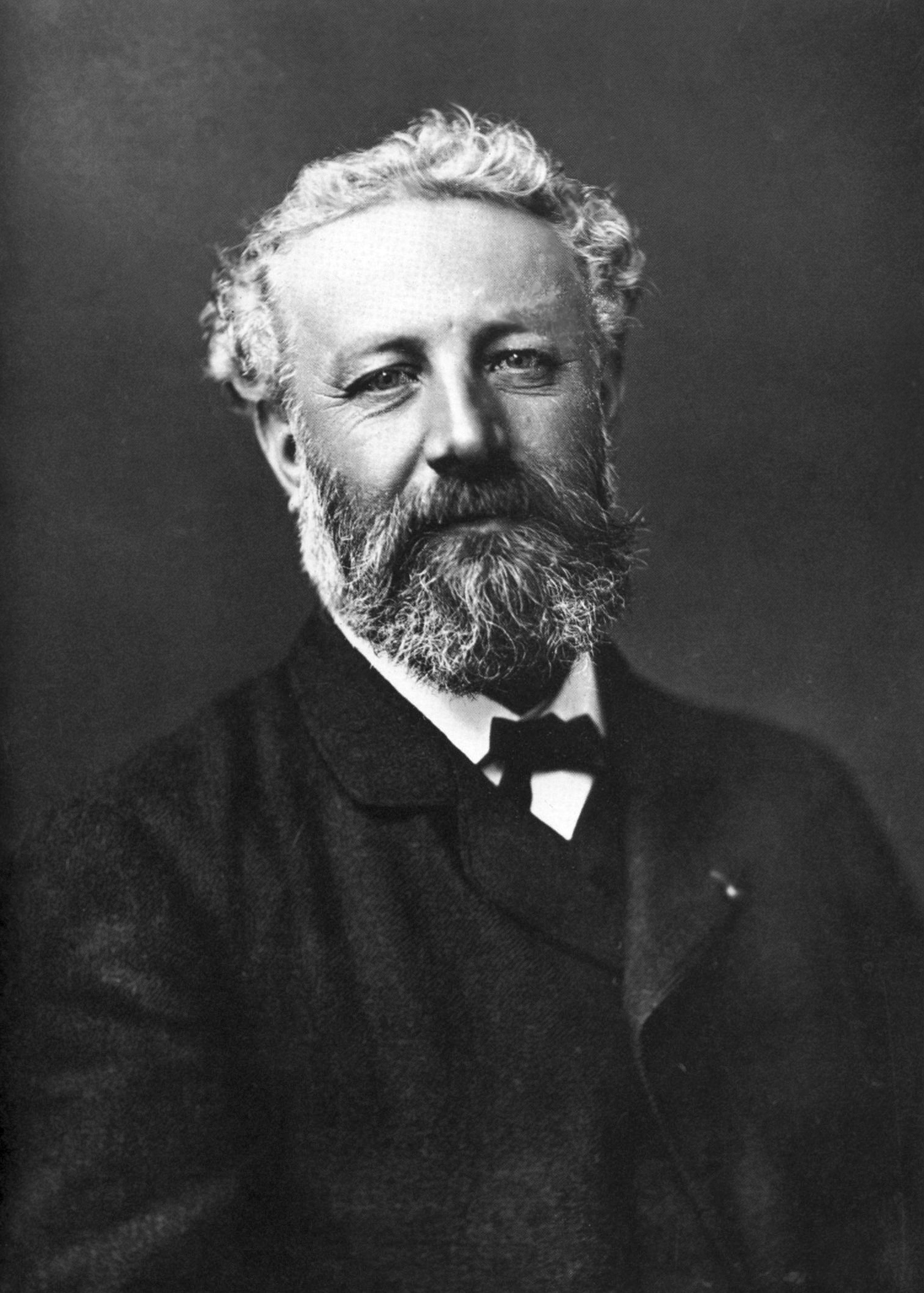
- Jules Verne
- Pronunciation: French: [ʒyl] English: /dʒuːlz/
- Gender: Male (as an anglophone name); Male (as a francophone name)

Origin
- Languages: 1. Greek; 2. Latin
- Meaning: 1. "devoted to Jove"

Other names
- Related names: Julia, Julian, Julie, Julien, Julio, Julius, Jolyon

Jules is the French form of the Latin "Julius" (e.g. Jules César, the French name for Julius Caesar).

In the anglosphere, it is also used for females although it is a predominantly masculine name. One of the few notable examples of a female fictional character with the name is Jules Lee from the American TV series Orphan Black: Echoes.

It is the given name of:

== People with the name ==
- Jules Aarons (1921–2008), American space physicist and photographer
- Jules Abadie (1876–1953), French politician and surgeon
- Jules Accorsi (born 1937), French football player and manager
- Jules Adenis (1823–1900), French playwright and opera librettist
- Jules Adler (1865–1952), French painter
- Jules Allen (disambiguation), multiple people
- Jules Angst (1926–2026), Swiss psychiatrist and academic
- Jules Asner (born 1968), American television personality
- Jules Aimé Battandier (1848–1922), French botanist
- Jules Bernard (born 2000), American basketball player
- Jules Bianchi (1989–2015), French Formula One driver
- Jules Breton (1827–1906), French artist
- Jules-André Brillant (1888–1973), Canadian entrepreneur
- Jules Brunard (1837–1910), French politician
- Jules Brunet (1838–1911), French Army general
- Jules Charles-Roux (1841–1918), French businessman and politician
- Jules Constantinople (born 2003), American ice hockey player
- Jules Cotard (1840–1889), French neurologist
- Jules Dewaquez (1899–1971), French footballer
- Jules Marie Alphonse Jacques de Dixmude (1858–1928), Belgian Army general
- Jules Armand Dufaure (1798–1881), French statesman
- Jules Engel, American filmmaker, painter, sculptor, graphic artist, set designer, and animator
- Jules Feiffer (1929–2025), American cartoonist
- Jules Gervais-Courtellemont (1863–1931), French war photographer from World War I
- Jules Greenbaum (1867–1924), German film producer
- Jules Jordan (composer) (1850–1927), American composer, operatic tenor, vocal instructor and conductor
- Jules Jordan (born 1972), American pornographic actor, director and producer
- Jules "Skip" Kendall (born 1964), American golfer
- Jules Gilmer Korner Jr. (1888–1967), American judge
- Jules G. Körner III (1922–2000), American judge
- Jules Koundé (born 1998), French footballer
- Jules LaDuron (1893–1980), American physician
- Jules Lefèvre (1863–1944), French biochemist and writer
- Jules Maenen (1932–2007), Dutch cyclist
- Jules Massenet (1842–1912), French composer
- Jules Michelet (1798–1874), French historian
- Jules Monge (1855–1934), French painter
- Jules Munshin (1915–1970), American actor, comedian and singer
- Jules Auguste Muraire (1883–1946), French actor
- Jules Achille Noël (1815–1881), French artist
- Jules Pastré (1809–1899), French banker, businessman and equestrian active in Egypt
- Jules Prown (born 1930), American art historian
- Jules Rimet (1878–1956), French football administrator and FIFA president
- Jules Segers (born 2002), French para-alpine skier
- Jules Shear (born 1952), American singer, songwriter and guitarist
- Jules Védrines (1881–1919), French aviator
- Jules Verne (1828–1905), French author
- Jules Walter (1929–2025), Antiguan actor
- Jules White (1900–1985), American film director and producer
- Jules Wright (theatre director) (1948-2015), Australian-English theatre director
- Jules Wright (politician) (1933-2022), American politician and businessman
- Jules Wuidart (1849–1932), British glass merchant

== Fictional characters ==
- Jules, one of the main character of the television series Orphan Black: Echoes
- Jules Cobb, the main character of the US television series Cougar Town
- Jules Maigret, a fictional French police detective, created by writer Georges Simenon.
- Jules Winnfield, fictional character in the film Pulp Fiction
- Jules Vaughn, one of the main characters in the US television series Euphoria
- Jules, a fictional character featured in the video game The Legend of Zelda: Breath of the Wild. In this case, the use of the name Jules is assigned to a young woman.
- Jules, a fictional artist from the musical Sunday in the Park with George
- Jules Hedgehog, fictional father of Sonic featured in Sonic the Hedgehog (Archie Comics)
- Jules Tournier, the twelve-year-old twin brother of Julie, and one of the two titular characters of the 1990s animated show- The Twins of Destiny
- Jules, a fictional character in the graphic novel On a Sunbeam by Tillie Walden
- Jules Van Patten, a fictional character from the film St. Elmo's Fire
- Jules Verne Durand, a linguist aboard the Daban Urnud in Anathem by Neal Stephenson
- Jules Brown, elder son of Emmett Brown in the Back to the Future franchise

== Other ==
- Jules (film), a 2023 feature film starring Ben Kingsley and Jane Curtin.

== See also ==
- Jewels
- Jools
- Julian (disambiguation)
- Julien (disambiguation)
- Julius (disambiguation)
