= Friedler =

Friedler is a surname. Notable people with this surname include:

- Eric Friedler (born 1954), an American tennis player
- Julien Friedler (born 1950), a writer and contemporary artist
- Sorelle Friedler, American computer scientist
