= Julius (name) =

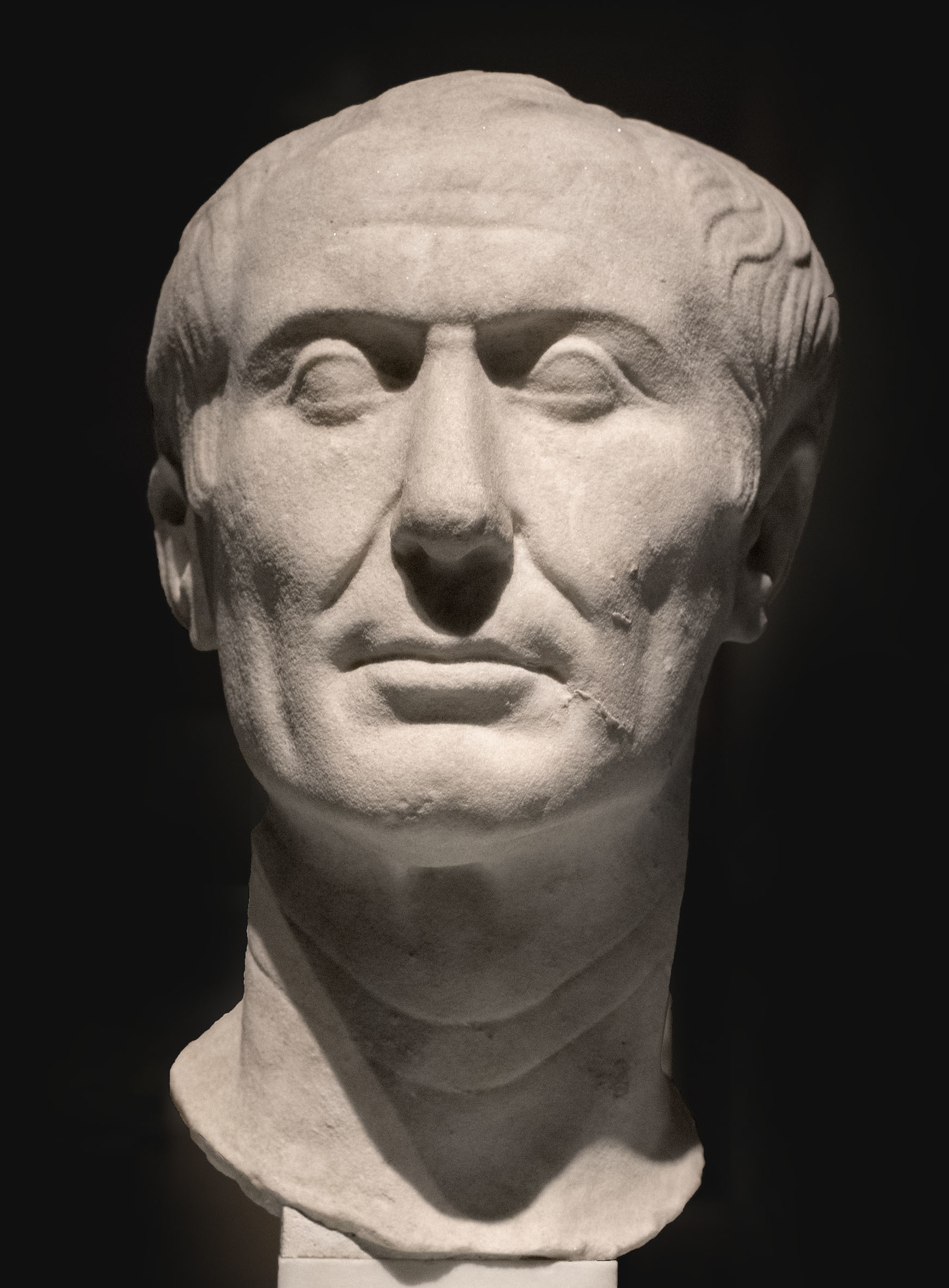
- Julius Caesar
- Gender: Male

Origin
- Origin: Greek or Latin
- Meaning: "Downy-bearded" or "devoted to Jove"

Other names
- Related names: Julia, Jules, Julie, Julien, Julio, Jolyon

Julius is a masculine given name and a surname, derived from the nomen of a Roman family, most famously Julius Caesar. The name may be derived from Greek ιουλος (ioulos) lit. 'downy-bearded' or from Latin Jovilius lit. 'devoted to Jove'. Julio/Júlio is the Spanish/Portuguese form and Jules is the French form.

== Given name ==
- Julius, the centurion given custody of Paul the Apostle in Acts 27
- Pope Julius (disambiguation), multiple popes
- Julius the Veteran (255–302), Catholic, Anglican and Eastern Orthodox saint and martyr
- Julius (judge royal) (fl. before 1135), nobleman in the Kingdom of Hungary
- Julius, Count of Lippe-Biesterfeld (1812–1884), German noble
- Julius, Duke of Brunswick-Lüneburg (1528–1589), German noble
- Julius Aghahowa (born 1982), Nigerian footballer
- Julius Akosah (born 1982), Cameroonian-Hongkonger (soccer) footballer
- Julius Axelrod (1912–2004), an American biochemist
- Julius Babao (born 1968), Filipino broadcast journalist
- Julius Bacher (1810–1889), German playwright and novelist
- Julius Balkow (1909–1973), East German engineer and politician
- Julius Bär (1857–1922), German banker
- Julius Bliek (born 1994), Dutch footballer
- Julius Boros (1920–1994), American golfer
- JuJu Brents (real name Julius; born 2000), American football player
- Julius Brink (born 1982), German beach volleyball player
- Julius Büdel (1903–1983), German geomorphologist
- Julius Buelow, American football player
- Julius Chestnut (born 2000), American football player
- Julius Eastman (1940–1990), American composer
- Julius Erving (born 1950), American basketball player
- Julius Eskesen (born 1999), Danish footballer
- Julius Evola (1898–1974), Italian philosopher
- Julius Fučík (composer) (1872–1916), Czech composer, the journalist's uncle
- Julius Fučík (journalist) (1903–1943), Czech journalist, the composer's nephew
- Julius Gregory (born 1988), American football player
- Julius Hirsch (1892–1945), German soccer player and Iron Cross recipient
- Julius Jørgensen (1880–1937), Danish runner
- Julius Kuperjanov (1894–1919), Estonian teacher and military officer
- Julius Köbner (1806–1884), Danish Baptist pioneer
- Julius Korir, Kenyan athlete
- Julius M. Korir (born 1963), Kenyan long-distance runner
- Julius Ingram (1832–1917), American politician.
- Julius Lenck (1845–1901), Hungarian-German brewer and businessman
- Julius Ludolf (1893–1947), German SS officer and concentration camp commandant
- Julius Wandera Maganda (born 1971), Ugandan politician
- Julius Mägiste (1900–1978), Estonian linguist and academic
- Julius Malema (born 1981), South African politician
- Julius Mandel aka Gyula Mándi (1899–1969), Hungarian football player and manager
- Julius Masvanise (born 1966), Zimbabwean athlete
- Julius Nyerere (1922–1999), president of Tanzania
- Julius Robert Oppenheimer (1904-1967), American theoretical physicist
- Julius Petersen (1839–1910), Danish mathematician
- Julius Richard Petri (1852–1921), German bacteriologist
- Julius Randle (born 1994), American basketball player
- Julius Reubke (1834–1858), German composer, pianist and organist.
- Julius La Rosa (1930–2016), American pop singer
- Julius Rudel (1921–2014), Austrian-born American conductor
- Julius Rosenberg (1918–1953), American communist
- Julius Schaub (1898–1976), chief aide and adjutant to Adolf Hitler
- Julius Schwartz (1915–2004), American comic book and pulp magazine editor
- Julius Samuel Scott Jr. (1925–2019), American minister, sociologist, community leader, teacher, and academic administrator
- Julius Sherrod Scott III (1955–2021), American scholar of slavery and Caribbean and Atlantic history
- Yulius Selvanus (born 1963), Indonesian politician and military office, governor of North Sulawesi
- Julius Seligson (1909–1987), American tennis player
- Julius Streicher (1885–1946), Nazi newspaper editor
- Julius Terpstra (born 1989), Dutch politician
- Julius Travis (1869–1961), American jurist from Indiana
- Julius Warmsley (born 1990), American football player
- Julius Welschof (born 1997), German American football player
- Julius Wolf (born 1993), German basketball player
- Julius Wood (born 2001), American football player
- Julius Zeyer (1841–1901), Czech romantic writer

== Surname ==
- Alice Julius (1846–1918), New Zealand artist
- Andrew Julius (born 1984), Montserrat footballer
- Anthony Julius (born 1956), British lawyer and academic
- Aron Julius, English actor
- Churchill Julius (1847–1938), first Archbishop of New Zealand
- David Julius (born 1955), American physiologist
- DeAnne Julius (born 1949), British-based American economist
- Eva Julius (1878–1972), Australian Girlguiding leader, wife of George
- George Julius (1873–1946), Australian inventor and engineer, husband of Eva
- Harry Julius (1885–1938), Australian commercial artist
- Henri Willem Julius (1901–1977), Dutch medical professor and cancer researcher
- Leigh Julius (born 1985), South African sprinter
- Max Julius (1916–1963), Australian barrister and communist
- Orlando Julius (1943–2022), Nigerian musician
- Victor August Julius (1851–1902), Dutch theoretical physicist
- Willem Henri Julius (1860–1925), Dutch solar physicist
  - E. Haldeman-Julius (né Emanuel Julius) (1889–1951), Jewish-American socialist

== Fictional characters ==
- Julius, book by Angela Johnson, illustrated by Dav Pilkey
- Julius, song by the band Phish on their album Hoist
- Julius Caesar, fictional character, Japanese name of Julian Konzern from the animated series Beyblade: Metal Masters (Metal Fight Beyblade: Explosion in Japan)
- Julius Nicholson, from the television series The Thick of It
- Julius Hibbert, a character from The Simpsons TV series
- Julius Little, fictional character in the Xbox 360 game Saints Row
- Julius Pringles, the name of the mascot for Pringles potato crisps
- Julius, a comic monkey character created by Paul Frank
- Julius, the father from the television series Everybody Hates Chris
- Julius, one of the main characters from the Canadian animated series Delilah & Julius
- The faction House of Julii from the computer game Rome: Total War uses Julius as the family name
- Julius Belmont, vampire hunter and descendant of Simon Belmont from the Castlevania series of video games
- Julius, a monster in the 1995 animated Mickey Mouse short, Runaway Brain
- Julius Geezer, a character from The Smurfs, where he forced Smurfette to marry his son unless Brainy wins a gladiator fight
- Dr. Julius Strangepork, a character in The Muppets
- Julius Sagamore, a character for The Millionairess, a play by George Bernard Shaw
- Julius the Cat, Walt Disney's first recurring animated character
- Julius Zebra, a book franchise from author Gary Northfield
- Julius Oppenheimmer Jr., a character from The Amazing World of Gumball
- Julius Euclius, a character from Re:Zero − Starting Life in Another World

== See also ==
- Julius (disambiguation)
- Jukka Nevalainen, a Finnish drummer whose nickname is Julius
