= Julien-Joseph =

Julien-Joseph is a French given name. Notable people with the name include:

- Julien Joseph Audette (1914–1989), pioneering Canadian aviator
- Julien-Joseph Ducorron (1770–1848), Belgian landscape painter
- Julien Joseph Vesque (1848–1895), French naturalist
- Julien-Joseph Virey (1775–1846), French naturalist and anthropologist

== See also ==
- Julien (given name)
- Joseph (given name)
