= Julio (given name) =

- Pronunciation: Spanish: ['xuljo] (Note: In Rioplatense Spanish, Julio is pronounced as either [ˈxuʃo] (with sheísmo) or [ˈxuʒo] (with zheísmo).)
- Gender: Masculine

Origin
- Languages: 1. Greek; 2. Latin
- Meaning: 1. "downy-bearded" 2. "devoted to Jove"

Other names
- Related names: Julius, Julia, Julie, Julian, Jules, Julien, Jolyon

Julio is a Spanish male given name. It can also be a family name or surname. See Julio (surname).

The equivalent in Portuguese is the accented Júlio.

== Acting ==
- Julio Alemán, Mexican actor
- Julio Mannino, Mexican actor

== Government and royalty ==
- Julio Acosta García, President of Costa Rica from 1920 to 1924
- Julio Argentino Roca, army general who served as President of Argentina
- Julio María Sanguinetti Coirolo, President of Uruguay
- Julio-Claudian Dynasty, the first five Roman Emperors
- Julio Pinedo, Afro-Bolivian king

== Sports ==
- Julio Anaya (born 1991), Panamanian basketball referee
- Julio Arca, Argentinian footballer
- Julio Arenas (born 1993), Spanish sprinter
- Julio Aparicio Díaz, Spanish bullfighter
- Julio Aparicio Martínez, Spanish bullfighter
- Julio César Aguirre, Colombian road cyclist
- Julio César Blanco, Venezuelan road cyclist
- Julio Bonetti (1911–1952), Italian baseball player
- Julio Briones, Ecuadorian association footballer
- Julio César Chávez, Mexican boxer
- Julio Ricardo Cruz, Argentinian association footballer
- Julio César Enciso (footballer, born 1974), Paraguayan association footballer
- Julio César Enciso (footballer, born 2004), Paraguayan association footballer
- Julio César González, light-heavyweight boxer
- Julio Enciso (born 2004), Paraguayan footballer
- Julio Franco (born 1958), American baseball player
- Julio César Herrera, Venezuelan track and road cyclist
- Julio Jones (born 1989), American football player
- Julio Lamas, Argentine basketball coach
- Júlio Lópes, Brazilian freestyle swimmer
- Julio Lugo (1975–2021), Dominican baseball player
- Julio César Luña, Venezuelan weightlifter
- Julio Mañón (born 1973), Dominican baseball player
- Julio Osorio (1939–2022), Panamanian basketball player
- Julio César Rangel, Colombian road cyclist
- Julio Robles (1951–2001), Spanish bullfighter
- Julio Rodríguez (born 2000), Dominican professional baseball outfielder
- Julio Santana (born 1974), Dominican baseball player
- Julio Santos, Ecuadorian freestyle swimmer
- Júlio Silva, Brazilian tennis player
- Julio César Urías, Guatemalan race walker
- Julio Urías (born 1996), Mexican professional baseball player
- Julio Valentín González, Paraguayan association footballer
- Julio Velasco, Argentine volleyball coach

== Other fields ==
- Julio Cortázar, Argentine intellectual and author of several experimental novels and many short stories
- Julio Fernández (disambiguation), multiple people
- Julio Garavito Armero, Colombian astronomer
- Julio Gonzalez (arsonist), unemployed Cuban refugee
- Julio González (sculptor), Spanish sculptor
- Julio Iglesias, Spanish international singer, father of singer Enrique Iglesias
- Julio Preciado, banda singer based in Mazatlán, Sinaloa, Mexico
- Julio Macat, Argentinian-born American cinematographer, and the husband of Elizabeth Perkins
- Julio Suárez, Guatemalan banker
- Julio Franco Arango, Colombian Roman Catholic bishop
- Julio Le Parc, Argentine artist, painter and sculptor living in Paris, France, since 1955
- Julio Zanotta Vieira (1950–2024), Brazilian playwright and novelist
- Julio Augusto Zachrisson (1930–2011), Panamanian graphic artist

== Disambiguation pages ==
- Julio Diaz (disambiguation)

== Fictional characters ==
- Julio Lopez, a character in the cartoon "M.A.S.K. (TV series)"
