= Julinho =

Julinho is the diminutive form of Portuguese Júlio, often used as a nickname. It may also be a given name in its own right. Notable people with the given name or nickname include:

- Julinho (footballer, born 1919) (1919–2010), Júlio Correia da Silva, Portuguese football forward
- Julinho (footballer, born 1929) (1929–2003), Júlio Botelho, Brazilian football right winger
- Julinho (footballer, born 1965), Julio César de Andrade Moura, Peruvian football striker
- Julinho (footballer, born 1979), Júlio César Teixeira, Brazilian football left-back
- Julinho (footballer, born 1986), Júlio César Godinho Catole, Brazilian football left-back
- Julinho (footballer, born 1987), Júlio César Machado Colares, Brazilian football left-back
- Julinho Camargo (born 1971), Brazilian football manager
- Julinho Mboane (born 1984), Mozambican football midfielder

== See also ==
- Julinho Sporting F.C., a Namibian football club
