= Loriot (disambiguation) =

Loriot was the stage name of Vicco von Bülow (1923–2011), a German humorist, graphic artist, director, actor, and writer.

It may also refer to:

== Surname ==
- Anne-Marie Loriot (born 1956), Olympic Athlete
- Fernand Loriot (1870-1932), French pacifist and politician
- Guillaume Loriot (born 1986), French footballer
- Julien Loriot (1633–1715), French priest

== Other ==
- "Loriot", a British term for the game Diabolo
- Loriot (ship), a mid-19th-century American ship
- "Loriot", Great Western Railway telegraphic code for a machine truck

== See also ==
- Oriole, a family of birds known in French as loriots
