= Gibert =

Gibert is a surname, and may refer to:

- Camille-Melchior Gibert (1797–1866), French dermatologist
- Jean-Amédée Gibert (1869–1945), French architect
- Jean-Pierre Gibert (1660–1736), French lawyer
- Jordi Sangrá Gibert (born 1980), Spanish canoer
- Julien Gibert (footballer, born 1976), French footballer
- Julien Gibert (footballer, born 1978), French footballer
- Maria Caroline Gibert de Lametz (1793–1879), French actress
- Montserrat Gibert (born 1948), Spanish (Catalan) politician

== See also ==
- Giberti, people with this surname
