= Juliusz =

Male given name

- Pronunciation: Polish: [ˈju.ljuʂ]
- Gender: Male
- Language: Polish

Origin
- Region of origin: Poland

Other names
- Related names: Julius, Julien

Juliusz is a Polish male given name. Notable people with the name include:

- Juliusz Bardach (1914–2010), Polish legal historian
- Juliusz Bursche (1862–1942), bishop of the Evangelical-Augsburg Church in Poland
- Juliusz Bogdan Deczkowski (1924–1998), noted Polish soldier during World War II, and later an engineer and inventor
- Juliusz Kaden-Bandrowski (1885–1944), Polish journalist and novelist
- Juliusz Karol Kunitzer (1843–1905), Polish-German industrialist, economic activist, philanthropist, and industrial magnate of Łódź
- Juliusz Kleiner (1886–1957), Polish historian and literary theorist
- Juliusz Kossak (1824–1899), Polish historical painter and master illustrator who specialized in battle scenes, military portraits and horses
- Juliusz Leo (1861–1918), Polish politician and academic
- Juliusz Łukasiewicz (1892–1951), Polish diplomat
- Juliusz Machulski (born 1955), Polish film director and screenplay writer
- Juliusz Nowina-Sokolnicki (1925–2009), Polish politician
- Juliusz Konstanty Ordon (1810–1887), participant of the Polish November Uprising in 1830–1831
- Juliusz Petry (1890–1961), Polish writer and the first director of Polish Radio in Lviv and Vilnius and, after World War II, in Wrocław
- Juliusz Rómmel (1881–1967), Polish military commander and a general of the Polish Army
- Juliusz Słowacki (1809–1849), Polish Romantic poet
- Juliusz Schauder (1899–1943), Polish mathematician
- Juliusz Wertheim (1880–1928), Polish pianist, conductor and composer
- Juliusz Zarębski (1854–1885), Polish composer and pianist, pupil of Franz Liszt
- Juliusz Żórawski (1898–1967), Polish architect, theoretist of architecture, interior designer, professor of Politechnika Krakowska
- Juliusz Żuławski (1910–1999), Polish poet, prose writer, literary critic and translator
- Juliusz Zulauf (1891–1943), Polish Army major general

== See also ==
- Juliusz Słowacki Polish Grammar School
- Juliusz Słowacki Theatre
- Media related to Juliusz (given name) at Wikimedia Commons
