= William Monk (artist, born 1863) =

English artist (1863–1937)

- Born: 1863; Chester, Cheshire, England
- Died: 1937 (aged 73–74)
- Education: Chester School of Art; Antwerp Academy
- Occupations: Etcher, wood-engraver and painter
- Spouse: Jenny Agnes Wuidart
- Children: 2
- Relatives: Jules Wuidart (father-in-law)

William Monk R.E. (1863–1937) was a British etcher, wood-engraver and painter in oils and watercolours.

Born in Chester, the son of gunmaker William Henry Monk, he studied art at the Chester School of Art and etching at the Antwerp Academy, Belgium.

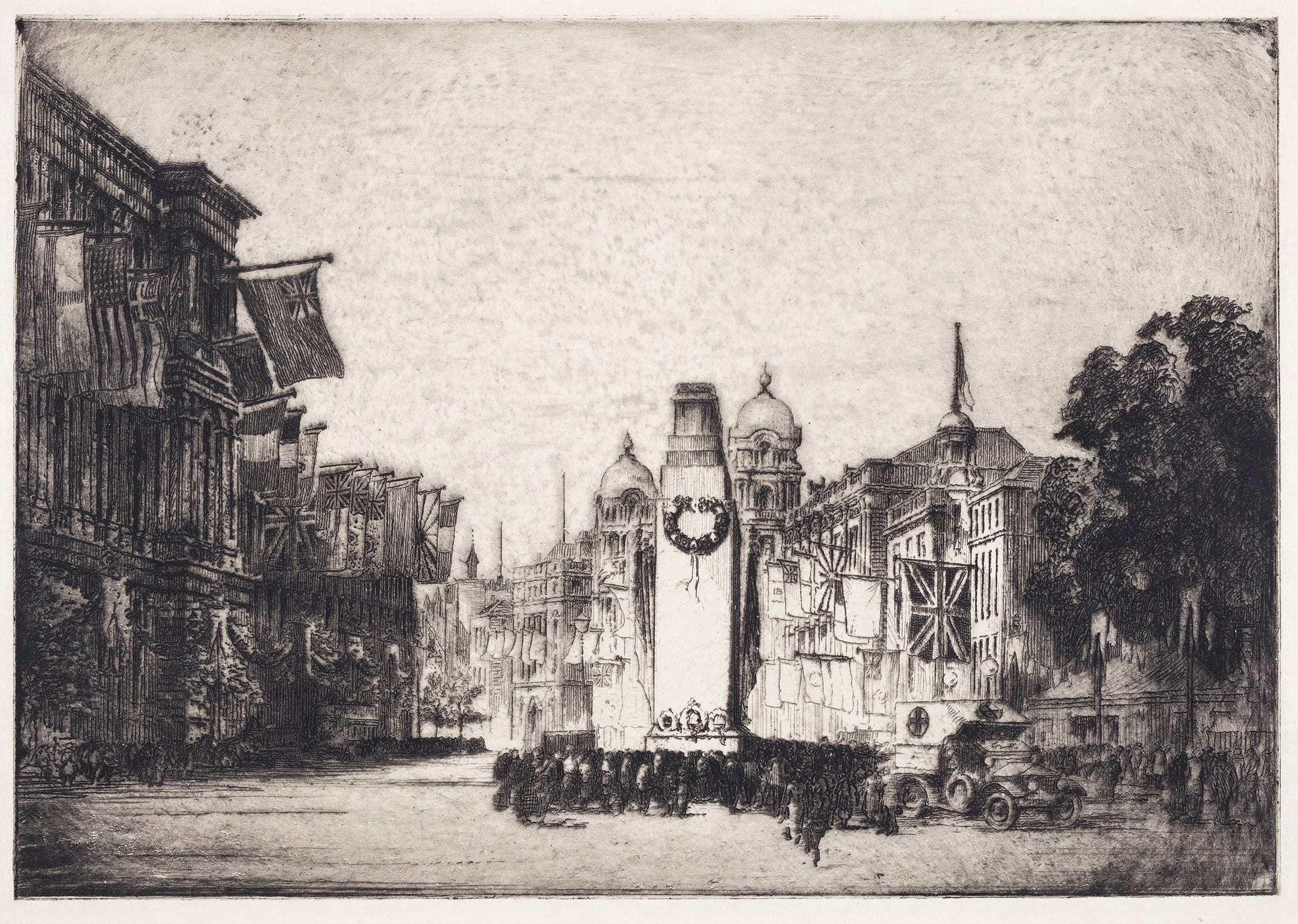
Monk's etching of the temporary cenotaph in Whitehall, London, in 1919, published in his calendar for 1920.

He was an Associate of the Royal Society of Painter-Etchers and Engravers from 1884 and elected a full member (R.E.) in 1899.

He lived in London from 1892 and published the "Calendorium Londonense" or "London Almanack" of his illustrations of London from 1903.

In 1901, he married Jenny Agnes Wuidart (1879–?), the daughter of Jules Wuidart (1849–1932), a wealthy glass merchant from Belgium and his German wife Agnes Reuleaux (1855–1923).

Their first son William Wuidart Monk was born in Hampstead in 1902. In 1903, they moved to The Gables, High Street, Old Amersham, where their youngest son Jules Monk was born on 4 December 1903. They lived in Chesham Bois, Bucks from 1911 to 1915.

The Wolverhampton company of Mander Brothers published a series of his views as calendars in the 1920s and 1930s. He returned to Chester in 1933.

Examples of his work can be found in the British Museum, the Victoria and Albert Museum and the Imperial War Museum. He exhibited at the Royal Academy in the Summer Exhibition from 1894 to 1933.

In 2013 the Grosvenor Museum, Chester, held an exhibition of his work: 'A Vision of England: Etchings by William Monk'.
