= Jools =

Jools is a given name, although it is primarily used as a nickname. Notable people with the name include:

- Jools Holland (born 1958), English pianist, bandleader and television presenter
- Jools Jameson (born 1968), British computer game developer
- Jools Lebron (born 1993/1994), American TikToker and internet celebrity
- Jools Topp (1958–2026), New Zealand entertainer and member of singing and comedy duo the Topp Twins

== Fictional ==
- Jools Siviter, a character in the television series Spooks
- Jools Fahey, a recurring character in The Brokenwood Mysteries

== Music ==
- Jools (band), an English sextet from Leicester

== See also ==
- Jules
