= Jean-Julien =

Jean-Julien is a given name. Notable people with the name include:

- Jean-Julien Chervier (born 1971), French writer and film director
- Jean-Julien Lemordant (1882-1968), Breton artist and French soldier and patriot
- Jean-Julien Rojer (born 1981), Dutch professional tennis player

== See also ==
- Jean Jullien (disambiguation)
- Jean (male given name)
- Julien (given name)
