= Chesham Bois =

Village in Buckinghamshire, England

Coordinates: 51.685°N 0.605°W

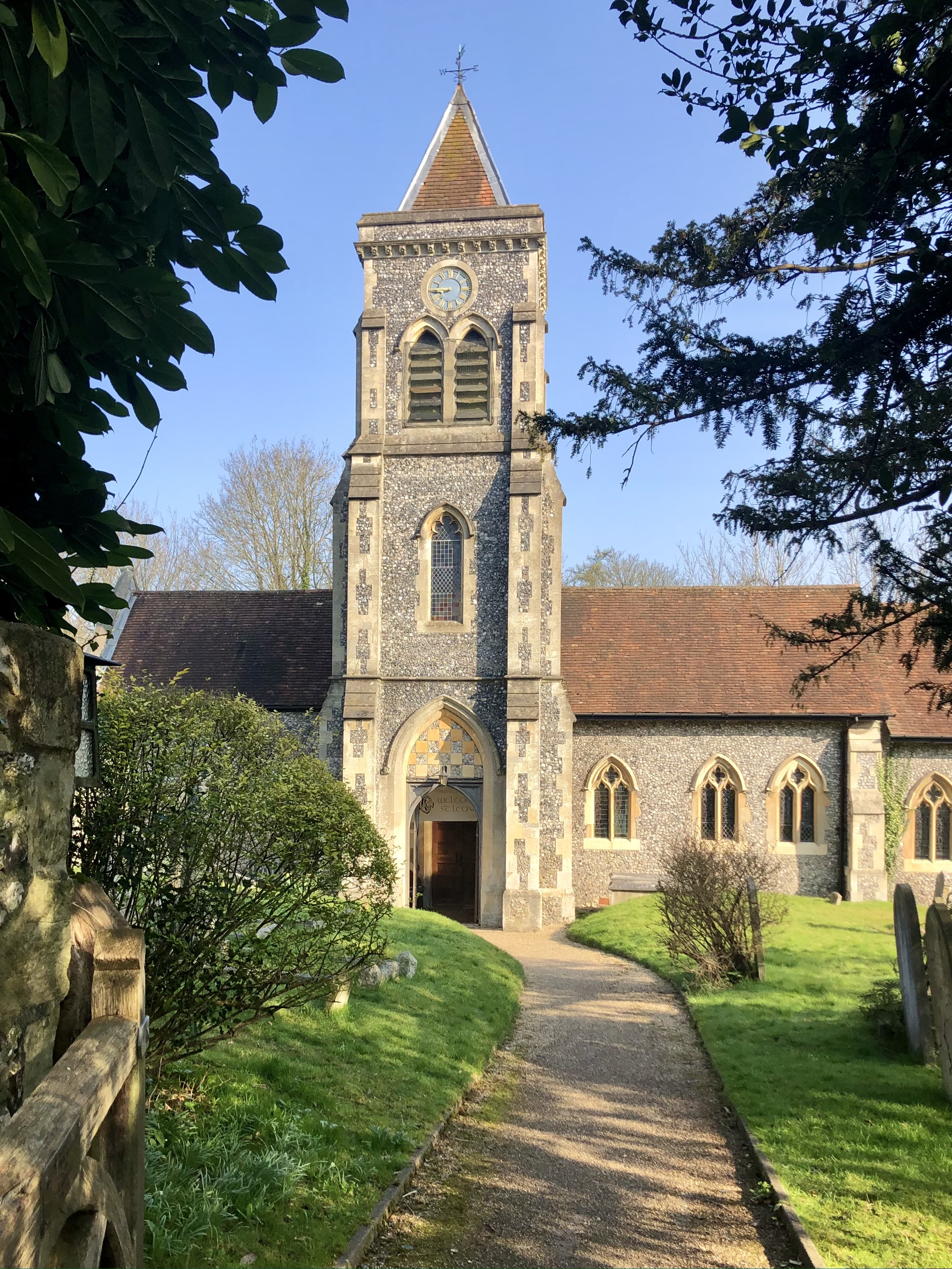
- St Leonard's Church, Chesham Bois

- Location within Buckinghamshire
- Population: 3,117 (2011 Census)
- OS grid reference: SU965995
- Unitary authority: Buckinghamshire
- Ceremonial county: Buckinghamshire
- Region: South East
- Country: England
- Sovereign state: United Kingdom
- Post town: AMERSHAM
- Postcode district: HP6
- Dialling code: 01494
- Police: Thames Valley
- Fire: Buckinghamshire
- Ambulance: South Central
- UK Parliament: Chesham & Amersham

Chesham Bois (traditionally /ˌtʃɛsəm ˈbɔɪz/ CHESS-əm BOYZ, but now more commonly /ˌtʃɛʃəm ˈbɔɪz/ CHESH-əm BOYZ) is a village in the Chiltern Hills, in Buckinghamshire, England, adjacent to both Amersham and Chesham.

== History ==
Initially a hamlet in the parish of Chesham, the manor was assessed at 1½ hides in the reign of King Edward the Confessor. The estate belonged to a brother of King Harold, who was killed with him at the Battle of Hastings, and William the Conqueror probably gave this "royal" land to his own half-brother, Odo, Bishop of Bayeux. The village gets its name from the de Bosco family (the French version of which was "de Bois") and by 1213, in the reign of King John, William du Bois was holding the manor. By about 1430, in the reign of Henry VI, the manor had been acquired by the Cheynes of Chenies who remained for over 300 years, before conveying the manor to the Duke of Bedford in 1735. Chesham Bois House, the site of the manor, was the subject of an archaeological excavation by television programme Time Team, which was broadcast in the United Kingdom on Channel 4 in March 2007.

During the 1920s and 30s, the Metropolitan Railway’s Amersham station was named “Amersham and Chesham Bois”.

== Notable people ==
Notable people born in Chesham Bois include the crime writer and composer Edmund Crispin; Lieutenant Commander Peter Scawen Watkinson Roberts, who was awarded the Victoria Cross during World War II; and Mervyn King, former governor of the Bank of England. Chesham Bois was for a time, home to artist William Monk, and The Grange, Bois Common (now demolished) was the long-time home of his father-in-law, the glass merchant Jules Wuidart.

== Today ==
The village contains two churches: the Anglican church of St. Leonard's (started in the 12th century) and the Roman Catholic Church of Our Lady of Perpetual Succour (built in 1915 and extended in 1953), which also houses the traditionalist Priestly Fraternity of Saint Peter. Chesham Bois C of E School (1893) is located down Bois Lane, a mixed primary school with over 200 pupils. The Beacon School is also located in the village and is an independent preparatory school educating over 400 boys. Also located in the village is Our Lady's Roman Catholic Combined School which is opposite the church of the same name. Elangeni School is situated at the end of Woodside Avenue and is a mixed state school. A 40-acre (160,000 m^{2}) sycamore and ash wood and common is the site of a cricket pavilion, as well as being the site for the biennial village fete.

Although "two hundred years ago it was in the depths of the country, a small village with no more than twenty-four houses", today some of Chesham Bois merges into Amersham-on-the-Hill.
