= Julien Gibert =

Julien Gibert may refer to:

- Julien Gibert (footballer born 1976), French football goalkeeper who played in Ligue 2 for ES Wasquehal
- Julien Gibert (footballer born 1978), French football defender who played in Ligue 2 for Dijon FCO
