= Julio (surname) =

Julio is a Spanish male surname or family name. It can also be a first name/given name. See Julio (given name).

The equivalent in Portuguese is the accented Júlio

Notable people with the surname include:

- Agustín Julio (born 1974), Colombian football player
- David Júlio (born 1932), South African-born Portuguese football player
- Deivi Julio (born 1980), Colombian amateur boxer and Olympian
- Ener Julio (born 1973), Colombian boxer
- Geraldo Júlio (born 1971), Brazilian politician
- Igor Julio (born 1998), Brazilian footballer
- Joel Julio (born 1985), Colombian boxer
- Jorge Julio (born 1979), Major League Baseball relief pitcher
- María Cristina Julio (born 1999), Chilean footballer
- Ricardo Julio (born 1976), Argentine racing cyclist

== See also ==
- Julio (disambiguation)
- Júlio
