= Jean Jullien =

Jean Jullien may refer to

- Jean Jullien (designer) (born 1983), French graphic designer
- Adolphe Jullien (Jean Lucien Adolphe Jullien; 1845–1932), French journalist and musicologist
- Jean Julien Angot des Rotours (1778–1844), French colonial governor

== See also ==
- Jean-Julien
