= Togoville =

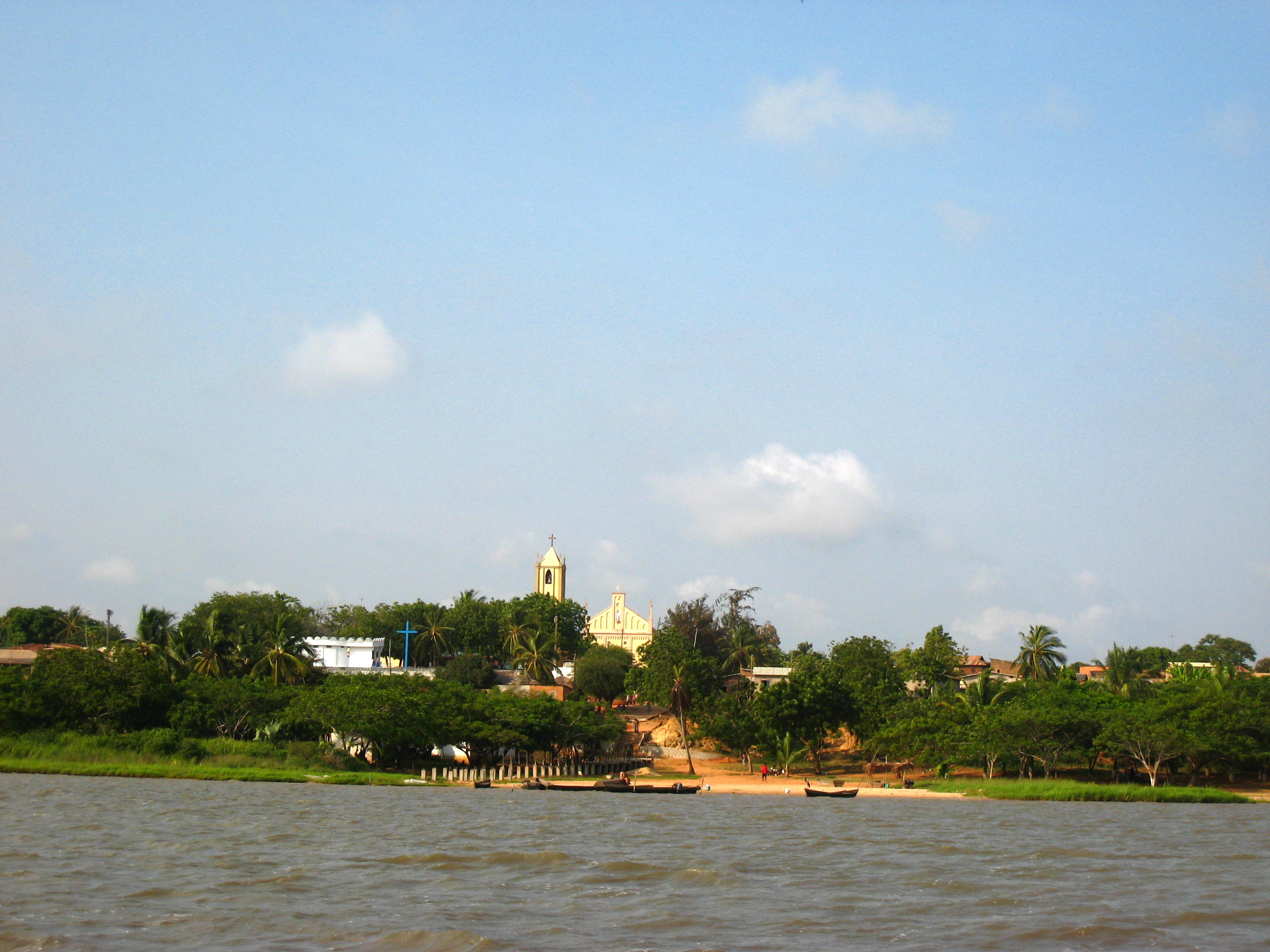

- Location in Togo
- Coordinates: 6°14′N 1°29′E
- Country: Togo
- Region: Maritime Region

Government
  - Type: city

Togoville (locally known as Togo-Bè) is a town and canton in southern Togo. It lies on the northern shore of Lake Togo. It was originally known as Togo. Like the country, the town is named after the lake.

== History ==
Gustav Nachtigal signed a treaty with the town's chief, Mlapa III, in 1884, from which Germany claimed dominion over what became Togo.

== Mlapa Dynasty ==
Prior to 1884, the kings controlled a territory around Lake Togo. They had the right to collect boat tolls, part of which was used for the kingdom and the other part for the palace. In addition, they were warlords leading their troops on the battlefield. Administratively, the kingdom of "Togo" was divided into five large villages, each with its own congregation of priests of the sacred forest. It was in this forest on the shores of the lake that they installed their "Nyiglin" fetish ceremonies.

Agomegan was the monarch of Togoville before colonization. His son, Mlapa III was king during the arrival of colonists on the kingdom's coast which led to the division of the five villages. The village of Agbodrafo fell under the influence of the French and British, who were already established in Benin and the Gold Coast (present-day Ghana). King Mlapa signed a treaty with the Germans giving them authority. From around 1950 until at least 1964 Sebastien Djossou Mlapa IV was king. In 1985 Mlapa V Moyennant became king After 17 years of regency, Togoville's sixth king Mlapa was elevated. He spent 18 years in education. Inducted on July 7, 2018, his name is Fiogan Joel Kwassi Mensah Mlapa VI (though Asrafo Plakoo Mlapa was previously considered the crown prince).

== Culture ==
Togoville Cathedral was built-in 1910, including a shrine to the Virgin Mary to mark where she is said to have appeared on November 7, in the early 1970s. This area is a centre for the practice of voodoo and voodoo shrines are present near the former royal palace. Nearby is a sacred forest.

West of the church is the Maison Royale, a small museum that houses Mlapa's throne and various historic relics and photographs. In June 1984, a monument commemorating the 100th anniversary of the treaty was erected.

== Education ==
Three main high schools are located in the town, College Notre Dame Du Lac of Togoville, College Saint Augustin and College d'Enseignement General of Togoville. Students come from across Togo and Africa to attend school there.

== Notable people ==
- Julien Amegandjin (born 1940), statistician and academic
