= Júlio =

Júlio is a Portuguese masculine given name. The equivalent in Spanish is Julio.

The diminutive form is Julinho, as in Júlio César Teixeira known as Julinho, a Brazilian footballer.

Notable people with the given name include:

- Júlio Afrânio Peixoto (1876–1947), Brazilian physician, writer, politician, historian, university president and eugenicist
- Júlio Pires Ferreira Sobrinho (1868–1930), was a Brazilian Portuguese professor, lawyer and philologist
- Júlio Almeida (born 1969), Brazilian sport shooter
- Júlio Andrade (born 1976), Brazilian actor and director
- Júlio Alves (born 1991), Portuguese footballer
- Júlio Alves (born 1994), Brazilian footballer

== See also ==
- Julio (disambiguation)
- Julio (surname)
