= Pierre-Julien =

Pierre-Julien is a masculine French given name. Notable people with the name include:

- Pierre-Julien Gilbert (1783–1860), French painter specialised in naval scenes
- Pierre-Julien Leclair (1860–1897), Canadian politician

== See also ==
- Pierre (given name)
- Julien (given name)
