= Giberti =

Giberti is a surname. Notable people with the surname include:

- Eva Giberti (1929–2025), Argentine psychologist and academic
- Gian Matteo Giberti (1495–1543), Italian bishop and diplomat
- Roland Giberti (born 1951), French politician

== See also ==
- Lorenzo Ghiberti (1378–1455), Italian Renaissance sculptor
- Giovanni Paolo Gibertini (1922–2020), Italian Roman Catholic bishop
- Gibert, people with this surname
