= Julien Sola =

French footballer (born 1984)

Personal information
- Date of birth: June 13, 1984 (age 42)
- Place of birth: Paris, France
- Height: 1.84 m (6 ft 1/2 in)
- Position: Midfielder

Senior career*
Years	Team	Apps	(Gls)
2001–2005	Toulouse B		
2005–2006	AS Moulins	34	(5)
2006–2010	Angers SCO	56	(4)
- * Club domestic league appearances and goals

Julien Sola (born June 13, 1984) is a French retired professional football player.
