= Julien Laubscher =

Julien Cassette
- Born: Julien Philip Laubscher; 5 June 1987 (age 39); Port Elizabeth, South Africa
- Genres: Pop, dance, disco, pop rock, electropop, house
- Occupations: Singer, songwriter, musician, producer, actor
- Instruments: Vocals, piano, keyboards
- Years active: 1998–present
- Label: Unsigned
- Website: www.juliencassette.com/

Julien Laubscher, also known as Julien Cassette, (born 5 June 1987) is a South African pop artist; singer, pianist, keyboardist, programmer, producer, musician and actor.

== Biography ==
=== Early work ===
The first published release he appeared on was as backing vocals on South-African recording artist Wesna Steenkamp's debut album, As Ek Jou Vanaand Kom Haal. ("When I pick you up tonight" in Afrikaans) in 2002. The album fared well in South Africa and Namibia, where it shot to number 1.

He continued to work with the producer of "As Ek Jou Vanaand Kom Haal" on a new demo for a cover-band project with Taryn Light and Liske Potgieter. The three formed "Vengaboys.South.Africa", a covergroup of 1990s Dutch dance group, the Vengaboys. Together they recorded a one demo track, a medley of their versions of some of the Vengaboys hits. In the summer of 2002 they performed on South-Africa's national children's entertainment television network, as well as at beach charity events (among others, for HIV/AIDS awareness) and festivals.

=== 2005–2006 ===
In 2005 Julien was asked to sing lead vocals for rock-band G.I.M.P. They became a resident band at rock/metal/indie club Jack Hamer's. Later that year they performed at the South-African division of the Woodstock Rock Music Festival. Shortly after this the band was invited by SABC Studios to record demos of some of their tracks. Julien later made separate acoustic recordings of these songs, as well as other new demo tracks in a singer/songwriter style. In 2006 he enrolled at the Conservatorium van Amsterdam, The Netherlands. During this time he performed regularly at trendy Amsterdam nightclubs, The Sugar Factory, Club Mp3/Club Meander, and the Wilhelmina Pakhuis.

=== 2009–present ===
In July 2009 he released So Electric. The launch took place in Port Elizabeth, South-Africa at Uptown Theatres. It was released internationally on digital format in September. On 26 May 2010 So Electric will be released on CD in the Netherlands with a full live show and release party in the Panama in Amsterdam.
In a 2010 interview he coined the phrase "Disney Disco" when asked to describe his own style/genre of music.

== Discography ==
=== Studio albums ===
- As Ek Jou Vanaand Kom Haal (Wesna Steenkamp) (2002)
- So Electric (Julien Cassette) (2009)

== Charts ==
As Ek Jou Vanaand Kom Haal (Wesna Steenkamp)

Year	Country	Position	Number of weeks
2002	South Africa	Unknown	Unknown
2002	Namibia	1	2
