= Jules Wuidart =

British glass merchant

Jules Amand Antoine Wuidart (1849–1932) was a Belgian-born British glass merchant and manufacturer.

== Career ==
In 1869, he founded the firm J. Wuidart & Co, at 26&28 Bartletts Buildings, Holborn Circus, London EC4.

In 1930, Wuidart commissioned James Powell and Sons (Whitefriars Glass) to manufacture the Wealdstone Range of vases and light fittings, designed by Barnaby Powell, and by 1932 had become the sole sellers of this range (originally with Elfverson & Co.)

J. Wuidart & Co continued at least until the 1950s, producing glassware themselves and importing glass from Orrefors, with Ronald Stennett Wilson working for them before setting up in his own right in King's Lynn.

== Personal life ==
He was married to Agnes Reuleaux (1855–1923), from Germany.

In 1901, they were living at 41 Compayne Gardens, South Hampstead, London. Their daughter Jenny and son-in-law William Monk lived in the same street. In 1903, William and Jenny moved to Amersham, and around the same time, the Wuidarts moved to neighbouring Chesham Bois, where they had a large house, The Grange, built on the Chesham road, overlooking Bois Common.

Their son Jules Reuleaux Wuidart (1879–1965) was also a glass merchant.

Their daughter Jenny Agnes Wuidart (1879–?), married the artist William Monk in 1901.

Their daughter Johanna Wuidart married merchant Carl Eduard Alfred Vogel (1869–1937), and they had three children.

Their daughter Maria Carola Wuidart (1889–1987) never married and continued to live at The Grange until her death in 1987.

Jules Wuidart died on 20 July 1932 at their home, The Grange, in Chesham Bois, Amersham, Buckinghamshire, leaving effects valued at £13,270, and his executors were Jules Reuleaux Wuidart and Carl Eduard Alfred Vogel, merchants.
