= Julien Aklei =

American singer-songwriter

- Born: November 20, 1975 (age 50); Philadelphia, Pennsylvania, U.S.
- Genres: Rock, folk rock, country rock, psychedelic folk
- Occupation: Singer-songwriter
- Instruments: Guitar vocals piano
- Years active: 2001–present
- Label: Pink Hyacinth Records
- Website: julienaklei.com

Julien Aklei (born November 20, 1975, in Philadelphia, Pennsylvania) is an American singer-songwriter, guitarist and artist.

Aklei was raised in Louisville, Kentucky where she graduated as a National Merit Scholar from Kentucky Country Day School in 1994 and went on to the University of Virginia as an Echols Scholar.

The Washington Post referred to Aklei as an "eerie-intriguing singer-songwriter" with a "haunting voice and a strangely tough-vulnerable stage presence."

Her work is characterized by deeply personal and otherworldly lyrics, and an emphasis on her voice over the music. Although she accompanies herself on several different instruments – including piano – her style of electric guitar and vocals are the linchpins of her sound. Aklei has experimented widely with differing music styles, including folk, jazz, rockabilly, and blues throughout a varied career.

== Blog Released Singles ==
Julien Aklei recorded and published over 200 songs, which are available as singles released from her website in blog format.

== Discography ==
- 2003 We Can Mate With Rabbits
- 2004 I Conquered while still in the Egg
- 2006 Pink Star of the Beautiful Ohio
- 2006 Coffee for My Captain
- 2006 The Odyssey
- 2006 New Friends
- 2007 Fun for Fairies!
- 2008 Savage Life

== Politics ==
Aklei is currently running for Delegate in Charleston West Virginia as a Republican.
