= Julio Fernández =

Julio Fernández may refer to:

- Julio Ángel Fernández (born 1946), Uruguayan astronomer who hypothesised the existence of what became known as the Kuiper belt
- Julio Fernández (film producer) (1947–2025), Spanish film producer, co-founder of the Fantastic Factory film studio
- Julio M. Fernandez (born 1954), Chilean professor in the Department of Biological Sciences at Columbia University, New York, USA
- Julio Fernández (musician) (born 1954), guitarist of jazz fusion/smooth jazz group Spyro Gyra
- Júlio "Foca" Fernandez (born 1957), Brazilian jiu-jitsu champion and instructor
- Julio Fernández Atienza, Chilean government official
