= Julius =

Julius may refer to:

== People ==
- Julius (name), a masculine given name and surname (includes a list of people with the name)
- Julius (nomen), the name of a Roman family (includes a list of Ancient Romans with the name)
  - Julius Caesar (100–44 BC), Roman military and political leader and one of the most influential men of classical antiquity
- Julius (judge royal) (fl. before 1135), noble in the Kingdom of Hungary
- Julius, Count of Lippe-Biesterfeld (1812–1884), German noble
- Julius, Duke of Brunswick-Lüneburg (1528–1589), German noble

== Arts and entertainment ==
- Julius (Everybody Hates Chris), a character from the American sitcom
- "Julius" (song), by Phish, 1994

== Other uses ==
- Julius (chimpanzee), a chimpanzee at Kristiansand Zoo and Amusement Park in Norway
- Julius (month), the month of the ancient Roman calendar originally called Quintilis and renamed for Julius Caesar
- Julius (restaurant), a tavern in Greenwich Village, New York City
- Julius (software), an open-source speech recognition decoder

== See also ==
- Julius Baer Group, a Swiss bank
- Julius Caesar (disambiguation)
- Juliusz, a given name
- Orange Julius, an American chain of fruit drink beverage stores, and eponymous beverage
