= Jolyon =

- Pronunciation: /ˈdʒoʊljən/ JOH-lee-ən
- Gender: Male

Origin
- Origin: Latin
- Meaning: "Youthful", "Soft haired"
- Region of origin: Europe

Other names
- Related names: Julius, Julio, Julian, Julien

Jolyon is a male given name, a medieval spelling variant of Julian, originating in England.

Notable people and characters with the name include:

== People ==
- Jolyon Brettingham Smith (1949–2008), British composer
- Jolyon Connell, British journalist
- Jolyon 'Jol' Danzig, co-founder of Hamer Guitars
- Jolyon Dixon (born 1973), English guitarist
- Jolyon Howorth (born 1945), British scholar of European politics and military policy
- Jolyon Jackson (1948–1985), Irish musician and composer
- Jolyon James, Australian-born actor
- Jolyon Maugham (born 1971), British barrister
- Jolyon Palmer (born 1991), British professional racing driver
- Jolyon Petch (born 1978), New Zealand DJ and music producer
- Jolyon Ralph, founder of the mineral database mindat.org in 1993
- Jolyon Rubinstein, British actor, writer, producer and director
- Jolyon Temple, Australian children's author

=== Alternative spellings ===
- Joleon Lescott (born 1982), English footballer

== Fictional characters ==
- Jolyon Wagg, a character from The Adventures of Tintin comics by Hergé
- Jolyon Forsyte, two characters (known as Old Jolyon and Young Jolyon) from The Forsyte Saga series of novels (and subsequent film adaptations) by John Galsworthy
- Jolyon Till, a character from Destiny 2

== Jolyon as a middle name ==
- Timothy Jolyon Carter (born 1969), English cricketer
- Louis Jolyon West (1924–1999), American psychiatrist and human rights activist
