= Andrew Julius =

Personal information
- Date of birth: 20 July 1984 (age 42)
- Position: Midfielder

Youth career
- Crystal Palace

Senior career*
Years	Team	Apps	(Gls)
	Crystal Palace	0	(0)
2003	→ Bromley (loan)		
2003	Barnet	0	(0)
- Crawley Town
- Hertford Town
- Braintree Town
2004	Erith & Belvedere		
2004–2005	Redbridge		
2005	Bromley		
2005–2006	Kingstonian		
2006	Redbridge		

International career^{‡}
2008–	Montserrat	3	(0)
- * Club domestic league appearances and goals as of 23:04, 13 April 2011 (UTC) ‡ National team caps and goals as of 23:04, 13 April 2011 (UTC)

Andrew Julius (born 20 July 1984) is an international footballer from Montserrat who plays as a midfielder.

== Career ==
=== Club career ===
After playing youth football with Crystal Palace, Julius moved on loan to Bromley in January 2003, and left Palace without making an appearance in the Football League for them. After playing with Barnet, Crawley Town, Hertford Town, Braintree Town, and Erith & Belvedere, Julius joined Redbridge in November 2004. Julius later re-joined Bromley, and was released by them in October 2005. After a spell with Kingstonian, Julius rejoined Redbridge in February 2006.

=== International career ===
Julius made his international debut for Montserrat on 26 March 2008, in a FIFA World Cup qualifier, and has three caps to date.
