= Julio Zanotta =

Brazilian playwright

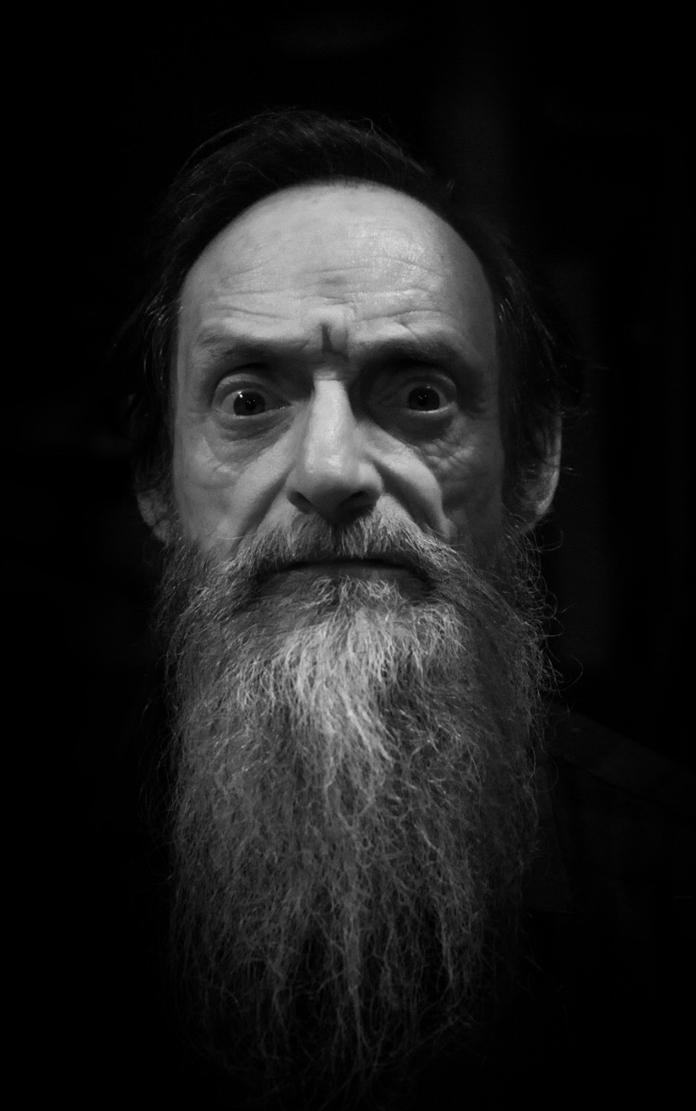
- Lemos in 2020
- Born: Julio Zanotta Vieira; August 18, 1950; Pelotas, Brazil
- Died: November 19, 2024 (aged 74); Porto Alegre, Brazil
- Occupations: Playwright short story writer novelist
- Website: https://juliozanotta.com.br

Julio Zanotta Vieira (Pelotas, August 18, 1950 – Porto Alegre, November 19, 2024) was a Brazilian playwright, short-story writer, and novelist.

Recognized as one of the most representative playwrights of Rio Grande do Sul, he was the author of powerful plays marked by parody and iconoclasm. He was one of the founders of the group Ói Nóis Aqui Traveiz, a reference in Porto Alegre's theater scene. Among his most acclaimed works are the award-winning Milkshakespeare and Uma Fada no Freezer ("A Fairy in the Freezer").

Over the course of his career, he published more than a dozen books, including novels and fictional novellas.

Due to the controversial and rebellious nature of his work, he was persecuted by the military dictatorship in Brazil and subjected to censorship.

== Biography ==
Zanotta grew up in the city of Pelotas, surrounded by the old book collections of his grandmother and father, which fostered his appreciation for literature from an early age. During this time, he gave up playing in the streets with other children to read a wide range of classic works, having read Lady Chatterley's Lover at the age of nine—a book that had a direct impact on his personal development.

His behavioral disorders led to psychiatric consultations from childhood, and at the age of eleven, he was admitted to a clinic by his parents.

He began his writing career during his teenage years, and after moving to Porto Alegre, he achieved his first professional success at the age of 19 when his short story "Pequeno" ("Little One") won the first edition of the Vivita Cartier Prize, held in Caxias do Sul in 1969.

At 20, he was already working as a journalist for Diário de Notícias and studying philosophy. During this period, he became involved in student movements and left the country in 1973 due to political issues.

Zanotta became involved in theater in the second half of the 1970s, founding the group Ói Nóis Aqui Traveiz in Porto Alegre, of which he was a member until 1978. He wrote and directed plays until 2019, presenting them throughout Brazil and in other Latin American countries. Due to the anarchic and subversive nature of his work, he was censored and persecuted during the military dictatorship.

In the 1990s, alongside his theater career, he opened his own bookstore, Ao Pé da Letra. He became known as one of the most respected booksellers in the capital of Rio Grande do Sul and published his first works of fiction. During this time, he also coordinated the Porto Alegre Book Fair and served as president of the Rio Grande do Sul Book Chamber. In 2023, he returned to the book business by opening Livraria Absurda in Porto Alegre.

He died on November 19, 2024, due to liver cancer.

Zanotta had four children with four different women.

== Death ==
Before his passing, Zanotta had overcome prostate cancer, but was soon after diagnosed with liver cancer, which ultimately proved fatal. He died on November 19, 2024, in a clinic where he spent his final days.

True to his personal view of death, he built his own coffin and instructed the gravediggers on the rituals he wanted performed around him.

== Posthumous Projects ==
Upon learning he had only a few weeks left to live, Zanotta wrote the script for a feature film about his own death. One month before passing, he spent two weeks filming scenes in Porto Alegre with his son, filmmaker Bernardo Zanotta, and a small crew. The production included visits to cemeteries and funeral homes, but due to the progression of his illness, parts of the script could not be filmed. Bernardo Zanotta continues working to complete the film, tentatively titled The Joy of Dying, with a release planned for 2026.

Zanotta also left his son at least three unpublished works: a collection of short stories written during his time living in Trancoso in the early 1980s; a novel based on his diary from the Marília play tour across Latin America; and an unfinished novel titled Destruction and Collapse of the City of Porto Alegre, with over 500 pages, which Zanotta began in the 1970s.

== Tributes and Recognitions ==
=== Honorary Title of Citizen of Porto Alegre ===
In 1998, Zanotta Vieira was awarded the title of Honorary Citizen of Porto Alegre, in recognition of his contributions to the city's cultural and artistic landscape.

=== Julio Zanotta Week ===
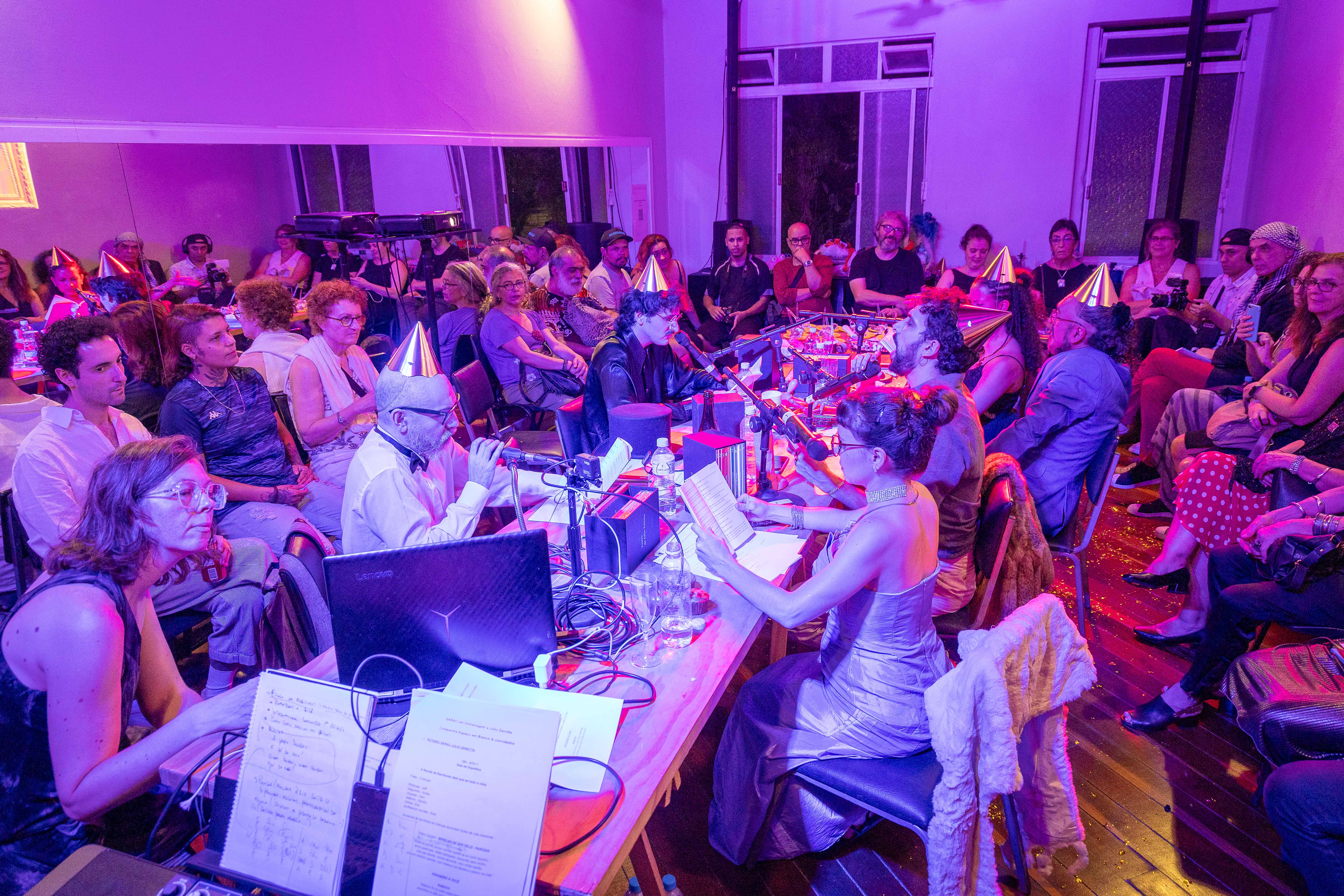
Posthumous tribute to Julio Zanotta

In 2013, Julio was honored by the Coordination of Performing Arts (CAC) of the Porto Alegre City Hall for his 35-year career. The event, titled Zanotta Week, featured nine nights of dramatic readings of his previously unpublished texts, directed by prominent directors from Porto Alegre's theater scene. The performances took place from August 19 to 27 at Sala Álvaro Moreyra. The final two nights were dedicated to a compilation of the playwright's short erotic texts.

=== Posthumous Tribute ===
On November 29, 2024, Zanotta received a posthumous tribute during the 31st edition of Porto Alegre em Cena, one of the city's major theater festivals. The tribute brought together numerous figures from Porto Alegre's theatrical community for eight continuous hours of dramatic readings of his works.

== Notable plays ==
Year	Portuguese title	Credit	Ref
1978	A Divina Proporção / A Felicidade Não Esperneia, Patati-Patatá	Written and directed by	
1979	A Libertação do Diretor-Presidente	Written and directed by	
1980	As Cinzas do General	Written and directed by	
1982	Marília	Written and directed by	
1986	Nietzsche no Paraguai	Written	
1988	Proezas e Virtudes do Prudente Presidente que por um Olho chorava Leite e pelo outro Azeite	Written and directed by	
2002	Baudelaire	Written and directed by	
2004	Louco – A Lenda Negra de Saxon Frobenius	Written and directed by	
2010	Milkshakespeare	Written	
2011	Uma Fada no Freezer	Written	
2012	O Apocalipse Segundo Santo Ernesto de La Higuera	Written	
2015	A Guerra Civil de Gumercindo Saraiva	Written and directed by	
2016	Lua de Mel em Buenos Aires, A Mulher Crucificada, O Beijo da Besta	Written	
2016	Ulisses no País das Maravilhas	Written and directed by	
2019	Um dia Sodoma, no outro Gomorra	Written and directed by	

== Published books ==
Year	Portuguese title	ISBN	Ref
1995	Louco		
1996	Teatro Lixo		
1997	E Nas Coxilhas Não Vai Nada?		
2012	O Apocalipse Segundo Santo Ernesto de la Higuera		
2014	A Ninfa Dragão		
2021	Pisa Leve	9786559271450	
2021	O Caralho Voador	9786559271405	
2022	Milkshakespeare	9786559271481	
2022	O Apocalipse segundo Santo Ernesto De La Higuera	9786559271528	
2022	Baudelaire Nietzsche No Paraguay	9786559271573	
2022	Ulisses no país das Maravilhas Luiza Felpuda Que graça tem esfaquear o Travesseiro?	I9786559271641	
2022	A Ninfa Dragão Sonho de Valsa	9786559271764	
2022	A Escola de Escritores Louco	9786559271993	
2022	O Homem Jaguar Pássaro Serpente Lua De Mel Em Buenos Aires A Mulher Crucificada – O Beijo Da Besta	9786559272006	
2022	Para Atores Licenciosos e Diretores Libertinos 1	9786559272280	
2022	Para Atores Licenciosos e Diretores Libertinos 2	9786559272273	
2022	Teatro Cruel	9786559272372	

== Awards and nominations ==
Year	Award	Category	Nominated work	Result	Ref
1969	Vivita Cartier Award	Literature	Pequeno	Won	
2003	Funarte Award	Playwriting	Milkshakespeare	Won	
2010	Açorianos Award	Playwriting	Milkshakespeare	Nominated	
2023	Açorianos Award	Playwriting	Milkshakespeare	Won	

== See also ==
- Tribo de Atuadores Ói Nóis Aqui Traveiz
