= Julien Lorthioir =

French footballer (born 1983)

Personal information
- Date of birth: 18 November 1983 (age 42)
- Place of birth: Douai, France
- Height: 1.80 m (5 ft 11 in)
- Positions: Midfielder; striker

Senior career*
Years	Team	Apps	(Gls)
2002–2005	Sedan	32	(2)
2005–2006	Tours	21	(2)
2006–2009	Rodez	82	(22)
2009–2010	Paris FC	25	(0)
2010–2016	Rodez	153	(29)
- * Club domestic league appearances and goals

Julien Lorthioir (born 18 November 1983 in Douai) is a French former professional footballer who played in Ligue 1 and Ligue 2 for Sedan. He also played for lower-division clubs Tours, Rodez and Paris FC.

Lorthioir retired from club football in July 2016. His most notable achievement was being part of the Sedan side that reached the 2005 Coupe de France Final, where he was an unused substitute as the Ligue 2 side lost to 2–1 to AJ Auxerre.
