= Pope Julius =

Pope Julius could refer to:

- Pope Julius I (saint; 337–352)
- Pope Julius II (1503–1513)
  - Pope Julius (game), a card game thought to be named after Pope Julius II
- Pope Julius III (1550–1555)
