= List of storms named Julio =

The name Julio has been used for seven tropical cyclones in the East Pacific Ocean:

- Tropical Storm Julio (1984) – a strong storm that paralleled the Mexican coast
- Hurricane Julio (1990) – a Category 3 hurricane with no impacts on land
- Tropical Storm Julio (2002) – weak storm that struck the southwestern coast of Mexico, affecting Guerrero and Michoacán states
- Tropical Storm Julio (2008) – moderately-strong storm that struck the Baja California peninsula
- Hurricane Julio (2014) – a Category 3 hurricane that passed north of Hawaii
- Tropical Storm Julio (2020) – a small and weak storm that paralleled the coast
- Tropical Storm Julio (2026) – short-lived storm that stayed at sea
