= Julien Klener =

Belgian linguist

Julien Klener is a Belgian linguist born in Ostend, Belgium in 1939.

== Life ==
During World War II he was a hidden child in Brussels. Since 1945, being back in Ostend, he went to primary and secondary school and later on studied Germanic languages (BA) and Semitic languages (BA, MA and PhD). His main languages being Biblical Hebrew, Akkadian, Biblical Aramaic, Talmudic Aramaic, Ugaritic, Arabic and also a non-Semitic language, Indonesian.

=== Teaching career ===
After a few years teaching on higher secondary level he continued his career at the Dutch-speaking Ghent University where he lectured until 2004. His main teachings concerned: Judaism as a cultural system, Biblical Hebrew (undergraduate and graduate students) Comparative linguistics of the Afro-Asiatic languages (graduate students), Semitic Epigraphy (graduate students) and General Introduction to Semitic Studies (graduate students). He also studied in Amsterdam, Jerusalem and in 1977 received a Fulbright-grant which brought him to California. During his tenure at Ghent University, he also taught at the French-speaking University of Liège for twelve years. He was invited as a guest-lecturer in Paris, Madrid, Naples, Riga, Budapest, Venice, Florence, Amsterdam, Jerusalem, Porto Alegre, etc. Although being retired in 2004, he was invited until 2011, to lecture on Judaism at the Faculty of Theology of the Catholic University of Leuven. He continued lecturing, until 2022, on Biblical-Aramaic and Philological Analysis of Biblical Texts at the Institut d' Etudes Juives of the Université libre de Bruxelles. Until the academic year 2020–2021 he lectured, also on Judaism at the Instituut voor Joodse Studies at the University of Antwerp, Belgium. He has been re-engaged, as a guest professor, at Ghent University for the academic years 2018–2019 and 2019–2020.

He is an honorary active member of the section for moral and political sciences at the Royal Academy for Overseas Studies. He is also active within different, academical and non-academical, Jewish, inter-religious and inter-convictional organisations. As a gifted, voluble trilingual speaker he is often asked to address national and international meetings on subjects concerning his academical specialisms or on matters reflecting upon the present and/or the future of European Judaism, lately for instance in Berlin (2012 and 2015), in Tel Aviv and Jerusalem (2013, 2014, 2015), at the European Parliament in Brussels (2010, 2012, 2013, 2015, 2016) and in Ottawa, Montreal and Berlin (2015), Washington DC, Luxembourg City (2016). Member of jury for PhD in Belgium, Holland, France and England.

=== President of the Consistoire ===
Between 2000 and the spring of 2015 he was the president of the Consistoire Central Israélite de Belgique / Centraal Israëlitisch Consistorie van België, which is the official Jewish umbrella organization representing Judaism vis-a-vis the Belgian State. As such he was regularly meeting with the Belgian authorities on matters concerning local Jewishness. These meetings sometimes happen together with the two other Belgian-Jewish roof-organizations: the Forum voor Joodse Organisaties, from Flanders and the CCOJB (Comité de Coordination des Organisations Juives de Belgique), a more French-speaking umbrella. As president of the Consistoire he represented the Jewish community of Belgium at the abdication ceremony of King Albert II and at the swearing in of king Philippe on 21 July 2013. The Consistoire was founded in 1808 by the emperor Napoleon I. The official celebrations of the Bicentenary were held in Brussels in 2008. One of the ceremonies was an academic session at the Great Synagogue of Brussels. Thanks to his efforts, the national event was deeply honored, and this for the first time since the Belgian independence in 1830, by the presence of the actual reigning king, Albert II. Julien Klener is also a Board Member of the Brussels-based organization CEJI - A Jewish Contribution to an Inclusive Europe.

Since 2006 he is also the Senior Vice President of the official Belgian Jewish Restitution Organization: la Fondation du Judaïsme Belge. Between 2016 and 2018 he accepted the presidency of the Foundation National Monument for the Belgian Jewish Martyrs and in 2016 he was appointed as the honorary president of the Consistoire Central Israélite de Belgique.

== Publications ==
He published approximately 120 monographies and articles on different aspects of his subjects, for example:

- Spanish Jewry at the Eve of the Expulsion, pp. IX-XIX, in: The Expulsion of the Jews and their Emigration to the Southern Low Countries, Leuven University Press, 1998.
- The Throne and Reign of David in the Apocrypha and Pseudepigrapha, pp. 455–475, in: Mesopotamian History and Environment, Cinquante-Deux Reflections sur le Proche-Orient Ancien offertes en Hommage à Leon De Meyer, Peeters, Leuven, 1994.
- Ba'al Milim, Liber Amicorum Julien Klener, ed. K. De Graef, p. 264, University Ghent, 2004
- The Tanakh in the Jewish Tradition, pp. 41–50, BAI Publishers, Antwerp, 2014

== National honours ==
- In 1991: Officer in the Order of Leopold;
- In 2003: Grand-Officer in the Order of the Crown and
- In 2007, he has been ennobled by the Belgian king, with hereditary peerage and the personal title of Baron, his motto being Memini ergo Ago, "I remember thus I act".
