= Julien Grondin =

French teqball player and former footballer (born 1993)

Julien Grondin (born 18 February 1993) is a French teqball player and former footballer, regarded as one of the most prominent teqball players worldwide.
