= Julien Fritz =

French rugby player (born 1990)

- Born: 10 January 1990 (age 36) Sens, Burgundy, France
- Height: 1.89 m (6 ft 2 1/2 in)
- Weight: 96 kg (15 st 2 lb)
- Notable relative: Florian Fritz (brother)

Rugby union career
- Position: Centre
Senior career
Years	Team	Apps	(Points)
2008–2010	Lyon OU	3	(0)
2010–	USA Perpignan	0	(0)
- Correct as of 4 December 2012

Julien Fritz (born 10 January 1990) is a French rugby union player. His position is Centre and he currently plays for USA Perpignan in the Top 14. He began his career with Lyon OU before moving to USA Perpignan in 2010. His brother is the French international Florian Fritz.
