= Julien Grujon =

French cyclist

Personal information
- Born: 7 May 1904
- Died: 16 October 1976 (aged 72)

Cycling career
- Sport: Cycling
- Discipline: Road
- Role: Rider

Julien Grujon (7 May 1904 – 16 October 1976) was a French racing cyclist. He rode in the 1928 Tour de France.
