= Julinho Mboane =

Mozambican footballer

Personal information
- Date of birth: 27 January 1984 (age 42)
- Position: Midfielder

Senior career*
Years	Team	Apps	(Gls)
- CD Costa do Sol

International career
2003–2007	Mozambique	4	(0)
- * Club domestic league appearances and goals

Julinho Mboane (born 27 January 1984) is a retired Mozambican football midfielder.
