= Lucie Favier =

French archivist and historian

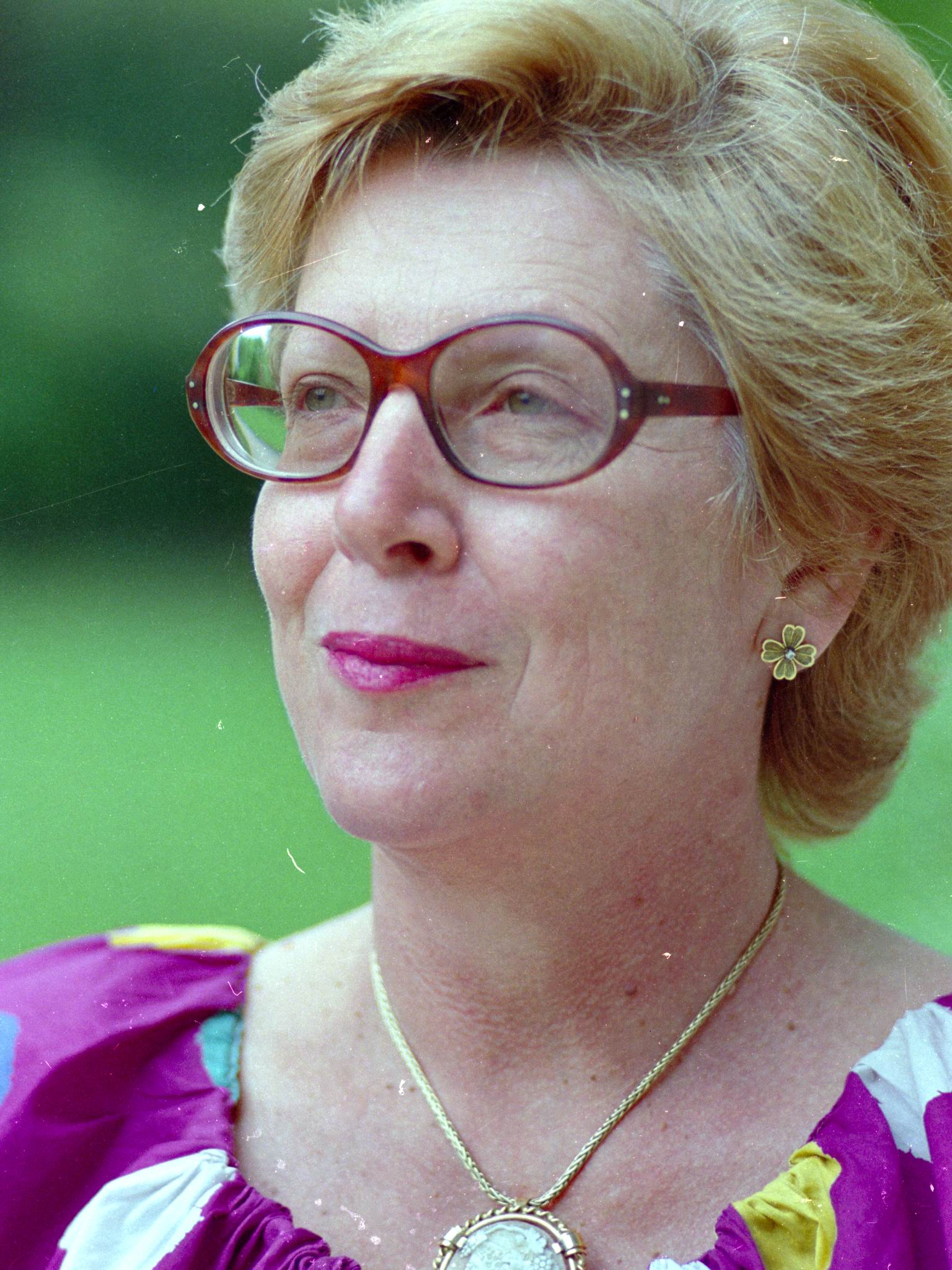
Favier in 1985

Lucie Favier (4 August 1932, Fes, French Morocco – 19 October 2003) was a French archivist, married to French historian Jean Favier.

== Biography ==
She studied at the École nationale des chartes, obtaining the title of archivist paleographer in 1956. She then spent two years in Rome as a researcher at the CNRS.

On her return, she was appointed to the National Archives, where she spent most of her career from 1959 to 1988. She started as a curator in the information service (1959-1984) and was appointed secretary general in 1984. In this capacity, she piloted the construction of the Reception and Research Center of the National Archives, known as CARAN. She also contributed to the renovation of the Museum of the History of France and the restoration of the buildings of the quadrilateral assigned to the National Archives, as well as the computerization of its services.

In 1988, she was appointed Inspector General of the Archives of France, a position she held for ten years until her retirement.

Her historical research focused on the late Middle Ages, including a thesis on Pierre Doriole, chancellor of Louis XI. Afterwards, she became very interested in the history of the National Archives.

== Works ==
- Un Chancelier de France sous le règne de Louis XI : Pierre Doriole, thesis for the diploma of archivist palaeographer, 1956.
- Lucie et Jean Favier, Les Archives nationales, quinze siècles d'histoire, Paris, Nathan, 1988.
- Lucie Favier, préf. René Rémond, La Mémoire de l'État : histoire des Archives nationales, Paris, Fayard, 2004 (ISBN 2-213-61758-9) (posthumous work completed by Jean Favier)
