= Sorelle Friedler =

American computer scientist

Sorelle Alaina Friedler
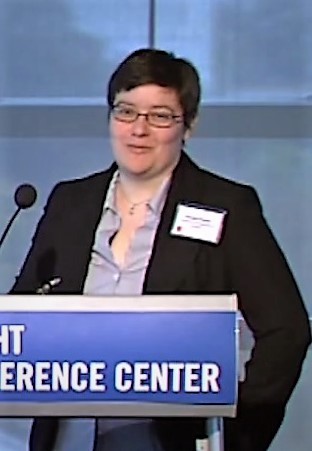
- Friedler in 2015
- Education: Swarthmore College; University of Maryland, College Park
- Scientific career
- Workplaces: Haverford College; Alphabet Inc
- Thesis: Geometric algorithms for objects in motion (2011)

Sorelle Alaina Friedler is an American computer scientist who is an associate professor at Haverford College. She is the co-founder Association for Computing Machinery Conference on Fairness, Accountability, and Transparency. Her research seeks to prevent discrimination in machine learning.

== Early life and education ==
Friedler earned her bachelor's degree at Swarthmore College. She moved to the University of Maryland, College Park for her graduate studies, where she studied geometric algorithms.

== Research and career ==
Friedler joined Alphabet Inc. as a software engineer, where she worked with X on the development of weather balloons that can provide internet access to remote communities.

Friedler has advocated for the careful use of artificial intelligence and machine learning. In particular, she has spoken about how biased data and algorithms reinforce social inequality. In 2015 she was made a Fellow at the Data & Society Research Institute.

Friedler has worked with Josh Schrier and Alexander Norquist on the application of data mining to accelerate materials discovery. They created a computer algorithm capable of predicting whether a set of reagents will create a crystalline materials when mixed in a solvent and heated. To create the tool, they compiled a database of almost 4,000 chemical reactions, wrote an algorithm that could mine for patterns in data and provide insight about why some experiments fail while others succeed. The algorithm was correct 89% of the time, whilst researcher (human) predictions only had a 78% success rate. Friedler and her co-workers published the database online (darkreactions.haverford.edu/) to encourage other researchers to share their data.

== Awards and honors ==
- 2006 AT&T Labs Fellowship Program
- 2009 Ann G. Wylie Dissertation Fellowship
- 2019 Chace/Parker Teaching Award
- 2019 Mozilla Responsible Computer Science Challenge

== Selected publications ==
- Feldman, Michael; Friedler, Sorelle A.; Moeller, John; Scheidegger, Carlos; Venkatasubramanian, Suresh (2015). "Certifying and Removing Disparate Impact". Proceedings of the 21th ACM SIGKDD International Conference on Knowledge Discovery and Data Mining. New York, New York, US: ACM Press. pp. 259–268. arXiv:1412.3756. doi:10.1145/2783258.2783311. ISBN 978-1-4503-3664-2. S2CID 2077168.
- "Machine Learning-Assisted Discovery of Solid Li-Ion Conducting Materials". doi:10.1021/acs.chemmater.8b03272.s001.
- Adler, Philip; Falk, Casey; Friedler, Sorelle A.; Rybeck, Gabriel; Scheidegger, Carlos; Smith, Brandon; Venkatasubramanian, Suresh (2016). "Auditing Black-Box Models for Indirect Influence". 2016 IEEE 16th International Conference on Data Mining (ICDM). IEEE. pp. 1–10. arXiv:1602.07043. doi:10.1109/icdm.2016.0011. ISBN 978-1-5090-5473-2.

== Personal life ==
Friedler is married to Rebecca Benjamin.
