= Jean Favier =

French historian (1932–2014)

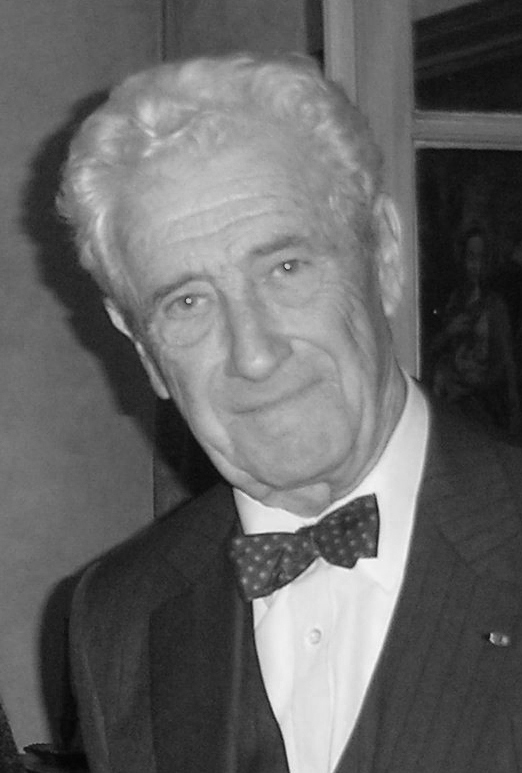
- Jean Favier (2005)
- Born: 2 April 1932; Paris, France
- Died: 12 August 2014 (aged 82); Paris, France
- Education: École Nationale des Chartes
- Occupation: Historian
- Spouse: Lucie Favier

Jean Favier (2 April 1932 – 12 August 2014) was a French historian, who specialized in Medieval history. From 1975 to 1994, he was director of the French National Archives. From 1994 to 1997, he was president of the Bibliothèque nationale de France.

He was a member of the Académie des Inscriptions et Belles-Lettres since 1985.

== Biography ==
After his secondary studies at the Lycées Buffon and Henri-IV, he was a student at the École nationale des chartes, from which he graduated as valedictorian in 1956 with a thesis entitled Un conseiller de Philippe le Bel : Enguerrand de Marigny. During the same year and for two years, he was appointed member of the École française de Rome.

He was first curator at the National Archives from 1958 to 1961. In 1961, he was appointed professor at the Lycée d'Orléans for 1961 and the following year. He then obtained a position as a research associate at the CNRS, which he held from 1962 to 1964.

In 1967, he defended his doctoral thesis on pontifical finances at the time of the Great Western Schism.

He first followed a career as a university lecturer at the University of Rennes (1964-1966), as a professor at the University of Rouen (1966-1969), then in Paris, as director of studies at the École Pratique des Hautes Études (1965-1997) and finally as a professor at the University of Paris Sorbonne in 1969. Until 1997 he taught medieval paleography there.

In parallel to his career as a teacher-researcher, he held leading positions in the administration of culture. In 1975 he was appointed General Director of the French Archives (also directly responsible for the direction of the Archives nationales), a position he held for 19 years, from 1975 to 1994, and which was marked by the promulgation of a new Law on archives, the construction of numerous archive buildings both in Paris and in the départements, and a very important international activity. Then, from 1994 to 1997, he was the first president of the Bibliothèque nationale de France.

From 1979 until its dissolution in 1998, he chaired the French Association for National Celebrations. From 2008 to 2012, he chaired the High Committee for National Celebrations (which became "National Commemorations" in 2011).

He was a member of the Académie des inscriptions et belles-lettres from 1985 (he became its president in 1995), president of the French Commission for UNESCO and a member of the club Le Siècle. He directed the Revue historique from 1973 to 1997.

His Philippe le Bel, published in 1978 after numerous scholarly publications, brought him to the attention of a wide public and inaugurated a long series of publications, mainly by Fayard, where he also directed, from 1992 to 1995, a six-volume History of France, of which he wrote the second volume entitled Le Temps des principautés. From the year 1000 to 1515, as well as a Dictionary of Medieval France, published in 1993.

Jean Favier was curator of the Château de Langeais, property of the Institute. He was also a radio personality, hosting in particular the program Question pour l'Histoire on France Inter. From 1984 to 1987, he was a director of TF1. From 1988 to 2002, he was president of the Association des lauréats du concours général. From 2007 to 2013, he was the first president of the Comité historique de la ville de Paris.

He died on August 12, 2014, of cancer. The funeral ceremony took place in the Saint-François-Xavier church (7th arrondissement of Paris). The Minister of Culture and Communication, Aurélie Filippetti addresses a tribute to the great historian and servant of the state.

He was married since 1956 to the archivist Lucie Favier. He is buried next to her in the Rabelais cemetery in Saint-Maur-des-Fossés

== Works ==
- « Introitus et exitus » sous Clément VII et Benoit XIII… , Istituto di paleografia dell' Università di Roma, Rome, 1957.
- Les Archives, PUF (coll. Que sais-je ?), Paris, 1959.
- Un conseiller de Philippe le Bel : Enguerran de Marigny, PUF, Paris, 1963.
- Les finances pontificales à l'époque du Grand Schisme d'Occident, 1378-1409, De Boccard, Paris, 1966.
- De Marco Polo à Christophe Colomb, Larousse, Paris, 1968.
- Les Contribuables parisiens à la fin de la guerre de Cent ans, les rôles d'impôt de 1421, 1423 et 1438, Droz, Paris/Genève, 1970.
- Paris au XVe siècle, Hachette, Paris, 1974.
- Le registre des compagnies françaises : 1449-1467, Imprimerie nationale, Paris, 1975.
- Philippe le Bel, Fayard, Paris, 1978.
- La Guerre de Cent ans, Fayard, Paris 1980.
- François Villon, Fayard, Paris, 1982.
- Une Histoire de la Normandie, Ouest-France, Rennes, 1986.
- De l'Or et des épices : naissance de l'homme d'affaires au Moyen âge, Fayard, Paris, 1987.
- Archives nationales: quinze siècles d'histoire, Nathan, Paris, 1988.
- L'Univers de Chartres, Bordas, Paris, 1988.
- Les Grandes découvertes : d'Alexandre à Magellan, Fayard, Paris, 1991.
- Le temps des principautés, Fayard, Paris, 1992.
- Dictionnaire de la France médiévale, Fayard, Paris, 1993.
- La France féodale, Le Grand livre du mois, Paris, 1995.
- La naissance de l'État, Le Grand livre du mois, Paris, 1995.
- Paris, Deux mille ans d'Histoire, Fayard, Paris, 1997.
- Charlemagne, Fayard, Paris, 1999.
- Louis XI, Fayard, Paris, 2001.
- Les Plantagenêts : origines et destin d'un empire : XIe-XIVe siècles, Fayard, Paris, 2004.
- Les Papes d'Avignon, Fayard, Paris, 2006.
- Le Roi René, Fayard, 2008 ISBN 978-2-213-63480-7
- Saint Onuphre : un après-guerre à l'ombre d'un clocher parisien, Fayard, Paris, 2009.
- Pierre Cauchon ou les maîtres dans la tourmente, Fayard, Paris, 2010 ISBN 978-2-213-64261-1
