= Julien Friedler =

Belgian artist and writer (1950–2022)

- Born: Julien Friedler; 13 November 1950; Brussels, Belgium
- Died: 1 June 2022 (aged 71)
- Known for: Literature, painting, sculpture, drawing
- Notable work: The Demoiselles revisited, In Quest
- Movement: Be art

Julien Friedler (13 November 1950 – 1 June 2022), a writer and contemporary artist, was the leading figure in the visual art movement known as Be art. Friedler was born in 1950 in Brussels.

== Early life and career ==
Friedler spent his childhood and adolescence in Brussels. He earned university degrees in philosophy at La Sorbonne and ethnography at the Université Libre of Brussels. He then studied psychoanalysis in Paris, following the post-structuralist theories of Jacques Lacan, while starting a personal psychoanalysis with Lacan. He had wide-ranging interests and subsequently trained in jewellery design. In the 1990s he established "La Moire" in Brussels, an institute to promote an interdisciplinary approach within the psychoanalytic field. He aimed to break through the constraints of classical psychoanalysis but encountered considerable resistance and ultimately left the psychoanalytical milieu.

Friedler began his artistic career in 1994. He was entirely self-taught but his insight into the human character and a fascination for the unknown led him to start painting. Through his art, he confronted postmodern contemporary society and the events of the second half of the 20th century. He emerged as a charismatic visionary taking a holistic approach while creating an organic microcosm, the World of Boz.

== Literature ==
During his career, Friedler wrote numerous articles and books which earned critical acclaim in the psychoanalytic field. In 2003 he set out to write an epic literary work entitled The Book of Boz. The Book of Boz is simultaneously a novel and a work of poetry, written mostly as a dialogue. The story unfolds in the 20th century, in the present, and in a fictitious future. The main characters are three clowns: Jack Balance, Friedler himself, and the Mirror Man.

== Visual work ==
Some of Friedler's paintings are done in a neo-expressionist style. Others feature shamanic stick figures that glow with inner energy or are lined with quasi-primitive symbols resembling Egyptian hieroglyphs; in particular, "The Word of Angels" depicts Friedler's self-conceived language whereby the artist refers to primeval myths that honor the connection between the supernatural and the profane as a theme. The youthful language of graffiti also appears in some works.

Much of Friedler's work contains biographical references, but these are often ambiguous. In order to understand Friedler's work it is necessary to understand some of the significant events in the artist's history and life, such as the Shoah and May 1968. The artist's visual work takes a central place in The Book of Boz and in the book he is forced to ultimately present his art to a wider audience and simultaneously confront the contemporary international art scene.

== Association ==
In 2008 Friedler created a contemporary art association called Spirit of Boz, which coordinates the Be Boz Be Art programme. This programme involves cultural and artistic projects conceived explicitly as art "for and by the masses". Friedler operates within his association, rather than be part of the art scene, and in doing so aims to make art accessible for a wide audience and in areas where art is least expected or entirely out of place. In that context art is used as a vehicle for improving social cohesion.

== Bibliography ==
- Mosaïque (1982) ISBN 2-86705-006-5
- L'ombre du rabbin (1985) ISBN 2-86705-043-X
- Psychanalyse et neurosciences : La Légende du Boiteux (1995) ISBN 2-13-046909-4
- L'ivrogne (1998) ISBN 2-912668-04-2
- Tiresias (1998) ISBN 2-85446-246-7
- L'œil d'Œdipe (2004) ISBN 2-13-054060-0
- Le Livre du Boz, 2013 ISBN 9782363360885
- Voyage, 2014 ISBN 9782363361493
- La Vérité du Labyrinthe, 2016 ISBN 9782363362711
- La Parole des Anges, 2018 ISBN 9791097042134
- Behind The World, 2018 ISBN 9791097042165
- Les Fondamentaux, 2020 ISBN 9791097042523
- Mapping, 2020 ISBN 9791097042387
- I Fondamentali, 2021 ISBN 9791097042745

== Books about Julien Friedler ==
- Norbert Hillaire, Double vue, 50 fragments pour Julien Friedler ISBN 2757205455
- Sonia Bressler, Julien Friedler, métaphysique de l'errance ISBN 2363360818
- Sonia Bressler, Julien Friedler, une vie d'Art ISBN 9791097042219
