= Julien Gibert (footballer, born 1978) =

French footballer

Personal information
- Date of birth: September 8, 1978 (age 48)
- Place of birth: Rillieux-la-Pape, France
- Height: 1.81 m (5 ft 11 1/2 in)
- Position: Defender

Senior career*
Years	Team	Apps	(Gls)
1997–1999	Lyon (B team)		
1999–2001	Pau FC		
2001–2005	Dijon FCO	90	(4)
2005–2006	Oostende		
2006–2008	SO Romorantin		
2008–2011	FC Martigues		
- * Club domestic league appearances and goals as of 13:34, 17 November 2011 (UTC)

Julien Gibert (born September 8, 1978 in Rillieux-la-Pape, Rhône) is a French professional football player.

He played on the professional level in Ligue 2 for Dijon FCO.
