= Julien Loriot =

French Oratorian preacher

Julien Loriot, Cong.Orat. (1633–19 February 1715), was a French priest of the Oratory of Jesus and theologian.

Loriot was born in the town of Laval, then in the ancient province of Maine. In 1654, at the age of 21, he joined a local Oratorian community, where he spent the next 40 years. At that point, he became an itinerant preacher in the rural regions of northern France.

Loriot became a noted preacher. Many of his sermons were recorded and published.

Loriot finally arrived in Paris, when he joined the noted Oratory on the Rue Saint-Honoré. It was there that he died.
