= Julien Joseph Audette =

Canadian aviator

- Born: June 6, 1914; Radville, Saskatchewan, Canada
- Died: October 28, 1986 (aged 72); Regina, Saskatchewan, Canada
- Occupation: Aviator

Julien Joseph Audette (June 6, 1914 – October 28, 1986) was a pioneering Canadian aviator dedicated to the development of the art of soaring.

== Early years ==
Julien Joseph Audette was born at Radville, Saskatchewan, June 6, 1914. Following graduation from Regina's Campion College, he successively worked in his father's grocery, Canada Packers, Gray Insurance and finally from 1937, for the Saskatchewan Government Audit Department.

== Second World War ==
In May 1941, he joined the RCAF and received his pilot's wings and commission at Yorkton on February 27, 1942. Following instructor positions at Trenton and Saskatoon and operational training at Comox, he was posted to the Far East where he flew the Douglas DC3 for the "Canucks Unlimited" 436 Burma Star Transport Squadron.

== Post-War ==
Following the war, he assisted in the formation of the Saskatchewan Air Ambulance Service and was its second pilot. In 1949, he became the first pilot with Kramer Air Service and eventually became Kramer Tractor's General Sales Manager. At the same time, he was active in the Prairie Road Builders Association and was President of the Regina Flying Club. He was Chairman of the Regina Chamber of Commerce's Aviation Committee and lobbied for improved air service, particularly for cross-border connections to North Dakota.

From 1976 until 1984, he was Sales Development Manager for Saskmont Engineering. He was also Director of the Roughriders Football Club for 27 years. Other associations to benefit from his energies were the Royal Canadian Flying Clubs Association, Ducks Unlimited, YMCA, Royal Canadian Legion, Air Force Association, Knights of Columbus and the Saskatchewan Western Development Museum.

It was however, in the field of non-powered flight that Julien Audette made his major contribution to Canadian aviation. In 1953, he was one of three founders of the Regina Gliding and Soaring Club and served as the Chief Tow Pilot, Chief Flying Instructor and President. He was instrumental in establishing a gliding scholarship for the Regina Air Cadets and for bringing three National Soaring competitions to Western Canada.

In 1962, he was awarded Canada's first Diamond Badge by the Federation Aeronautique Internationale (FAI), #240 in the world. He was the only Canadian to earn this badge while establishing Canadian Soaring records and was the first Canadian to break (30,000 feet (9,100 m)) in a sailplane.

On the national level, he was FAI Awards Chairman of the Soaring Association of Canada (SAC). He was the only Canadian to hold all eight competitive awards available, six simultaneously.

- 1958 Distance to Goal and Return 322 km
- 1958 Distance to Goal 380 km
- 1961 Absolute Altitude 9336 m
- 1961 Gain of Height 7108 m
- 1961 200 km Triangle 72.6 km/h
- 1962 300 km Triangle 65.0 km/h
- 1962 Free Distance 603.8 km
- 1964 100 km Triangle 85.0 km/h

For the 1958 Distance to Goal, he won the Barringer Memorial Trophy of the Soaring Society of America - the only Canadian so honored. The 1961 altitude flight earned him Canada's first Symonds Wave Memorial Plaque and Lennie pin.

With his record free distance flight on April 22, 1962 Julien Audette became the first Canadian to combine a wave flight (27,300 feet (8,300 m)) with a thermal flight.

During his soaring in the Cowley, Alberta area, 1960 to 1975, he worked closely with the Federal Meteorology Department. Recognizing that the soaring prospects in the Pincher Creek area could be enhanced by a better knowledge of the climatology of wave clouds, he initiated a data collection program. This "Audette Project" provided the foundation for studies by others including the University of Calgary's Environmental Science Center. Another legacy project is the Regina Gliding and Soaring Club for which Julien Audette was a founding member.

== Honours and legacy ==
- SAC President's Choice Award (1959, 1962)
- SAC Canadair Trophy (1961, 1962)
- Fédération Aéronautique Internationale Paul Tissandier Diploma - Certificate of Honour (1967)
- Carling Trophy, Alberta Soaring Council (1964, 1967)
- Bruce Soaring Trophy (1967)
- Saskatchewan Sports Hall of Fame (1977)
- Canada's Aviation Hall of Fame (1989)
