= Julien Favier =

French professional football player (born 1980)

Personal information
- Date of birth: September 28, 1980 (age 46)
- Place of birth: Carcassonne, France
- Height: 1.70 m (5 ft 7 in)
- Position: Midfielder

Team information
- Current team: RCO Agde

Senior career*
Years	Team	Apps	(Gls)
2003–2004	US Marseille Endoume		
2004–2006	FC Sète	32	(0)
2006–	RCO Agde		
- * Club domestic league appearances and goals as of 18:43, 24 November 2009 (UTC)

Julien Favier (born September 28, 1980 in Carcassonne) is a French professional football player. Currently, he plays in the Championnat de France amateur for RCO Agde.

He played on the professional level in Ligue 2 for FC Sète.
