= Jill =

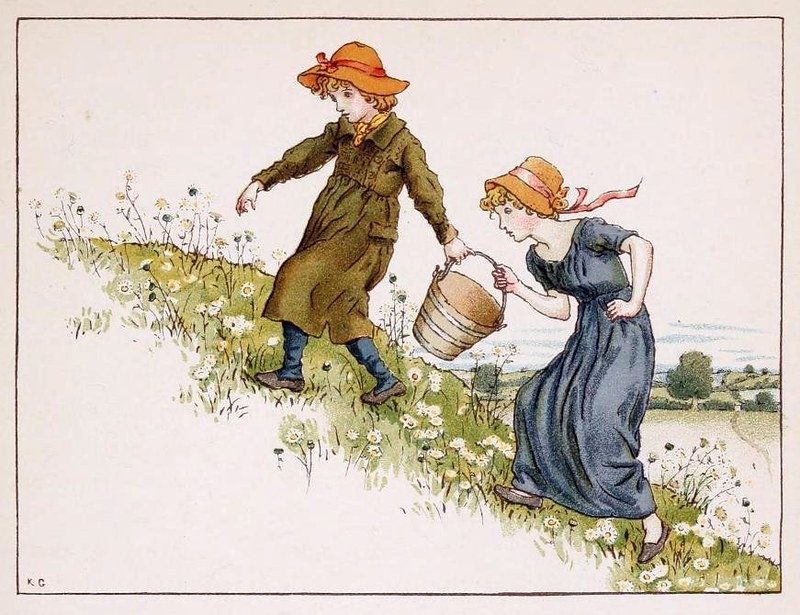
- Jack and Jill by Kate Greenaway, 1900.
- Gender: Primarily feminine

Origin
- Region of origin: England

Other names
- Variant form: Juliana

Jill is an English feminine given name, often a short form of the name Gillian or Jillian, which in turn originated as a Middle English variant of Juliana. Jill was such a common name that it had an everygirl quality, as in the 15th century English nursery rhyme Jack and Jill. By the 17th century, the name had become a term for a "common street jade", implying promiscuous sexual behavior, and declined in usage in the Anglosphere. Usage of the name increased again in the 20th century. The name was most used in English-speaking countries from the 1930s to the 1970s. It is currently well-used in the Netherlands.

== People with the given name ==
- Jill Abramson (born 1954), American author, journalist, and academic
- Jill Alesch, American politician
- Jill Andrew, Canadian politician
- Jill Andrews (born 1980), American singer-songwriter
- Jill Astbury, Australian researcher into violence against women
- Jill Balcon (1925–2009), British actress
- Jill Barber (born 1980), Canadian singer-songwriter
- Jill S. Barnholtz-Sloan, American biostatistician and data scientist
- Jill Becker, American psychological researcher
- Jill Bialosky (born 1957), American writer
- Jill Biden (born 1951), American educator and the First Lady of the United States
- Jill Bilcock (born 1948), Australian film editor
- Jill Bonner (1937–2021), British-American condensed matter physicist
- Jill Brothers (born 1983), Canadian curler
- Jill E. Brown (born 1950), African American aviator
- Jill Bryson (born 1961), Scottish singer and member of Strawberry Switchblade
- Jill Carroll (born 1977), American journalist
- Jill P. Carter (born 1964), American politician
- Jill Clayburgh (1944–2010), American actress
- Jill Cooper (tennis) (born 1949), British tennis player
- Jill Corey (1935–2021), American popular standards singer
- Jill Costello (1987–2010), American athlete and lung cancer activist
- Jill Craigie (1911–1999), British film director and writer
- Jill Craybas (born 1974), American tennis player
- Jill Dando (1961–1999), British television presenter
- Jill Dickman, Republican member of the Nevada Assembly
- Jill Dillard (born 1991), American reality TV personality
- Jill Ellis (born 1966), American football manager
- Jill Esmond (1908–1990), English actress
- Jill Evans (born 1959), Welsh politician
- Jill Filipovic (born 1983), American author and attorney
- Jill Fisch, American professor at the University of Pennsylvania Law School
- Jill Frappier (born 1944), British voice actress
- Jill Freedman (1939–2019), American photographer
- Jill Furse (1915–1944), English actress
- Jill Gallagher (born 1955), Australian community activist
- Jill Gallard, British diplomat
- Jill Garner, Australian architect
- Jill Gascoine (1937–2020), English actress and novelist
- Jill Gibbon, British artist
- Jill Gibson (born 1942), American singer, songwriter, photographer
- Jill Giegerich (born 1952), American artist
- Jill Gilbeau (born 1987), American soccer player
- Jill Gilmore (born 1973), New Zealand footballer
- Jill Godmilow (1943–2025), American filmmaker
- Jill Gohdes (born 1990), Australian field hockey player
- Jill Goldsmith, American TV writer and producer
- Jill Goldston (born 1943), English actress
- Jill Goldthwait, American politician
- Jill Golick (born 1956), Canadian screenwriter
- Jill Gomez (1942–2026), Trinidadian and British soprano
- Jill Goodacre (born 1964), American model and actress
- Jill Green (dance educator), American dance educator and scholar
- Jill Green (politician), Canadian politician
- Jill Greenberg, Canadian-American photographer
- Jill Greenwood (1910–1995), English artist and nuclear disarmament activist
- Jill S. Grigsby, American sociologist
- Jill Hackland (born 1947), South African international lawn bowler
- Jill Halfpenny (born 1975), British actress
- Jill Hall (born 1949), Australian politician
- Jill Hall (athlete) (born 1946), British athlete
- Jill Hammond (born 1950), Australian basketball player
- Jill R. Harper (born 1972), American molecular biologist
- Jill Harries, British historian
- Jill Harris, American voice actress
- Jill Clarke Harrison, English long-distance runner
- Jill Hartman (born 1974), Canadian poet and editor
- Jill Haworth (1945–2011), English-American actress
- Jill Heinerth (born 1965), Canadian cave diver
- Jill Hellyer (1925–2012), Australian poet
- Jill Henneberg (born 1974), American equestrian
- Jill Hennessy, Canadian actress and musician
- Jill Hennessy (politician) (born 1972), Australian politician
- Jill Henselwood (born 1962), Canadian equestrian
- Jill Hetherington (born 1964), Canadian tennis player and coach
- Jill Higginson, American biomechanical engineer
- Jill Hoare (born 1933), English computer scientist
- Jill Hoffman, American poet and editor
- Jill Holterman (born 1991), Dutch long-distance runner
- Jill Hood-Linzee (1928–2007), British figure skater
- Jill Hooks, New Zealand accountancy academic
- Jill M. Hooley, British psychologist
- Jill Horan, Irish camogie player
- Jill Horstead (born 1967), Canadian swimmer
- Jill Hruby (born 1959), American civil servant
- Jill Hunter (born 1966), English long-distance runner
- Jill Lorie Hurst (born 1901), American writer
- Jill Hutchison (born 1945), American basketball coach
- Jill Hyem (1937–2015), British actor and screenwriter
- Jill Idh, Swedish kickboxer
- Jill Insley, British journalist
- Jill Ireland (1936–1990), British actress
- Jill Irving (born 1963), Canadian equestrian
- Jill Jack, American musician
- Jill Jacobs (rabbi) (born 1975), American rabbi
- Jill Jacobson (1954–2024), American actress
- Jill James, American biochemist and autism researcher
- Jill Janssens (born 2003), Belgian footballer
- Jill Janus (1975–2018), American heavy metal singer
- Jill Jim, American health administrator and epidemiologist
- Jill St. John (born 1940), American actress
- Jill Johnson (born 1973), Swedish singer-songwriter
- Jill Johnson (swimmer) (born 1969), American swimmer
- Jill Johnston (1929–2010), American feminist author
- Jill F. Johnstone, Canadian ecologist
- Jill Jolliffe (1945–2022), Australian journalist and author
- Jill Jones (born 1962), American singer and songwriter
- Jill Jones (curler) (born 1975), American curler
- Jill Jones (poet) (born 1951), Australian poet
- Jill Marie Jones, American actress
- Jill de Jong (born 1982), Dutch actress
- Jill Justin (born 1967), American softball player
- Jill Karofsky (born 1966), American judge
- Jill Kelley (born 1975), Lebanese-American philanthropist, activist, and diplomatic advisor
- Jill Kelley (born 1971), American pornographic actress, director and producer
- Jill Kinmont Boothe (1936–2012), American alpine ski racer and schoolteacher
- Jill Knight (1923–2022), British politician
- Jill Koford, American politician
- Jill Konrath, American business writer
- Jill Koshiol, American cancer epidemiologist
- Jill Larson (born 1947), American actress
- Jill Lepore (born 1966), American historian
- Jill MacLean (born 1941), Canadian writer
- Jill Malone (fl. 2009–2013), American novelist
- Jill Martin (1938–2016), English musical theatre actress
- Jill McKnight, Canadian politician
- Jill Mellick, Australian Jungian-oriented clinical psychologist
- Jill Milroy, Australian Aboriginal academic
- Jill Morris (born 1967), British diplomat
- Jill Murphy (1949–2021), English writer and illustrator
- Jill Norman, British editor and food writer
- Jill Officer (born 1975), Canadian curler
- Jill Ovens, Zealand trade unionist, politician, and activist
- Jill Parrish (born 1961), American lawyer and judge
- Jill Piper (1959/1960–1976), American murder victim
- Jill Pizzotti (born 1966), American college basketball coach
- Jill Roord (born 1997), Dutch professional footballer
- Jill Saulnier (born 1992), Canadian ice hockey player
- Jill Savery (born 1972), American competitor in synchronised swimming and Olympic champion
- Jill Saward (1965–2017), English campaigner and author
- Jill Scott (born 1972), American singer
- Jill Scott (born 1987), English footballer
- Jill Sebastian (born 1950), American educational innovator and artist
- Jill Siegfried, American pharmacologist
- Jill Slattery (born 1945), British swimmer
- Jill W. Smith, American philanthropist
- Jill Sobule (1959–2025), American singer-songwriter
- Jill Stanley, Canadian actress who was a cast member on the Canadian sketch comedy TV series You Can't Do That on Television
- Jill Sterkel (born 1961), American former competition swimmer, Olympic champion, former world record-holder, and water polo player
- Jill St. John (born 1940), American actress
- Jill Talley (born 1962), American voice actress
- Jill Tarter (born 1944), American astronomer
- Jill Thompson (born 1966), American illustrator and write
- Jill Long Thompson (born 1952), American politician and academic
- Jill Tokuda (born 1976), American politician
- Jill Tracy, American musician
- Jill Trenary (born 1968), American former figure skater
- Jill Vedder (born 1977), American philanthropist, activist and former fashion model
- Jill Vidal (born 1982), Hong Kong singer
- Jill Viles (bor 1974), American writer
- Jill Wagner (born 1979), American actress
- Jill Paton Walsh (1937–2020), English novelist and children's writer
- Jill Watson (born 1963), American retired pair skater and coach
- Jill Zarin, American television personality
- Jill Zimmerman (born 1959), computer scientist and professor at Goucher College

== Fictional characters ==
- Jill, a character in the nursery rhyme "Jack and Jill"
- Jill Foster Abbott, a character on the soap opera The Young and the Restless
- Jill Archer, a character from the BBC Radio 4 soap opera, The Archers
- Jill Layton, a character from the 1985 dystopian black comedy film film Brazil
- Jill Masterson, from Goldfinger
- Jill Pole, a main character in C. S. Lewis' The Chronicles of Narnia: The Silver Chair
- Jill Roberts, a main character in Scream 4
- Jill Taylor, the wife of Tim Taylor from the ABC sitcom Home Improvement
- Jill Valentine, a character from the Resident Evil video games series
- Jill Warrick, the lead female character from Final Fantasy XVI
- Jill, a character in Katharine Kerr's Deverry Cycle book series

== Jill as middle name ==
- Amy-Jill Levine (born 1956), feminist theology professor
- J. Jill Suitor, sociology professor
- Suzanne Jill Levine (born 1946), American poet and translator
- Lara Jill Miller (born 1967), American actress
