= Jilly =

Jilly is a feminine given name. Notable people with the name include:

- Jilly Cooper (1937–2025), English author
- Jilly Curry, British skier
- Jilly Goolden (born 1956), British wine critic, journalist and television personality
- Jilly Johnson (born 1953), British model, Page 3 girl
- Jilly McCord, Scottish former rugby union player
- Jilly Rizzo (1917 – 1992), American restaurateur and entertainer
  - Jilly's, a popular New York City night club owned by Jilly Rizzo
- Jilly Shimkin (born 2003), American soccer player

Fictional characters:

- Jilly Kitzinger character in the science fiction series Torchwood
- Jilly Coppercorn, character in 2001 book The Onion Girl

== See also ==
- Jilly's, a strip club on the lower floor of the New Broadview House Hotel in Toronto, Canada
- The Jillies series, a series of works by author Malcolm Saville
- Skye-Jilly Edwards (born c. 1972) Australian beauty pageant titleholder
- Jillie Cooper (born 1988), Scottish professional badminton player
- Jillie Mack (born 1957), English stage actress
- Jill (disambiguation)
- Jillian
- Gillian
