= Gillian =

Gillian may refer to:

== Places ==
- Gillian Settlement, Arkansas, an unincorporated community

== People ==
Gillian (variant Jillian) is an English feminine given name, frequently shortened to Gill. It originates as a feminine form of the name Julian, Julio, Julius, and Julien. It is also in use as a surname.

Notable people with the name include:

=== First name ===
- Gillian Alexy (born 1986), Australian actress
- Gillian Allnutt (born 1949), English poet
- Gillian Anderson (born 1968), American actress
- Gillian Apps (born 1983), Canadian ice hockey player
- Gillian Armstrong (born 1950), Australian film director
- Gillian Avery (1926–2016), British children's novelist and literary historian
- Gillian Ayres (1930–2018), English painter
- Gillian Bailey (born 1955), British academic and actress
- Gillian Barge (1940–2003), English actress
- Gillian Baverstock (1931–2007), British author
- Gillian Baxter (1938–2025), British children's book writer
- Gillian Beer (born 1935), British literary critic
- Gillian Bevan (born 1950), British actress
- Gillian Blake (born 1949), British actress
- Gillian Blakeney (born 1966), Australian dance musician
- Gillian Bonner (born 1966), American model
- Gillian Bouras (born 1945), Australian writer
- Gillian Boxx (born 1973), American Olympic medalist
- Gillian Bradshaw (born 1956), American writer
- Gillian Carnegie (born 1971), English artist
- Gillian Chan (born 1954), Canadian children's author
- Gillian Chung (born 1981), Hong Kong singer
- Gillian Clark (aid worker) (c. 1956–2003), Canadian humanitarian
- Gillian Clark (born 1961), English badminton player
- Gillian Clarke (born 1937), Welsh poet
- Gillian Condy (born 1952), South African botanical artist
- Gillian Conoley (born 1955), American poet
- Gillian Coultard (born 1963), English football player
- Gillian Cowley (born 1955), Zimbabwean field hockey player
- Gillian Cowlishaw (born 1934), New Zealand-born anthropologist
- Gillian Cross (born 1945), English children's writer
- Gillian Elisa (born 1953), Welsh actress
- Gillian Evans, British philosopher
- Gillian Ferrari (born 1980), Canadian ice hockey player
- Gillian Findlay, Canadian television journalist
- Gillian Florence, Canadian rugby union player
- Gillian Flynn, American author and television critic
- Gillian Forrester, psychologist and cognitive science researcher
- Gillian Foulger, English geologist
- Gillian Galbraith, Scottish crime writer
- Gillian Gilbert (born 1961), British keyboardist, guitarist and vocalist
- Gillian Gilks (born 1950), English badminton player
- Gillian Gowers (born 1964), English badminton player
- Gillian Greer, New Zealand literary scholar
- Gillian Guess (born 1955), Canadian criminal
- Gillian Hills (born 1944), film actress
- Gillian Horovitz (born 1955), English long-distance runner
- Gillian Howell (1927–2000), British architect
- Gillian Howie, English philosopher
- Gillian Jacobs (born 1982), American stage and film actress
- Gillian Jones, Australian actress
- Gillian Joseph (born 1969), British newscaster
- Gillian Kearney (born 1972), English actress
- Gillian Knight (born 1934), English singer and actor
- Gillian Lindsay (born 1973), Scottish rower
- Gillian Lowndes (1936–2010), English ceramic sculptor
- Gillian Lucky (born 1967), Trinidad and Tobago politician and lawyer
- Gillian Lynne (1926–2018), British ballerina, actor, theatre and television director, and choreographer
- Gillian Martin, Scottish politician
- Gillian Martin (badminton), Scottish international badminton player
- Gillian McConway, English cricketer
- Gillian McCutcheon (born 1939), British actress
- Gillian McKeith (born 1959), Scottish non-fiction writer
- Gillian Merron (born 1959), British politician
- Gillian Moore (headteacher), retired Australian school principal
- Gillian Moore (born 1944), English chess player
- Gillian Morgan (born 1953), British civil servant
- Gillian Murphy (born 1979), American dancer
- Gillian Norris (born 1978), Irish dancer and model
- Gillian O'Sullivan (born 1976), Irish race walker
- Gillian Oliver (born 1943), British nurse
- Gillian Porter (born 1965), Northern Irish television presenter
- Gillian Pugh, British social welfare official
- Gillian Rolton (1956–2017), Australian equestrian
- Gillian Rose (1947–1995), British scholar
- Gillian Rose (geographer) (born 1962), British geographer
- Gillian Rubinstein (born 1942), Australian children's author and playwright
- Gillian Russell (born 1973), Jamaican athlete
- Gillian Sewell (born 1972), Canadian field hockey player
- Gillian Sheen (1928–2021), British fencer
- Gillian Shephard, Baroness Shephard of Northwold (born 1940), British Conservative politician
- Gillian Slovo (born 1952), South African novelist, playwright and memoirist
- Gillian Small, American biologist
- Gillian Smith (born 1965), English cricketer
- Gillian Sorensen, senior advisor at the United Nations Foundation
- Gillian Spencer (born 1939), American soap opera actress and writer
- Gillian Stroudley (1925–1992), English painter and printmaker
- Gillian Taylforth (born 1955), English actress
- Gillian Akiko Thomson (born 1974), Filipino swimmer
- Gillian Tindall, British writer
- Gillian Triggs, Australian lawyer
- Gillian Vigman (born 1972), American comic actress
- Gillian Vogelsang-Eastwood (born 1950), Dutch textile historian
- Gillian Wearing (born 1963), English artist
- Gillian Weir (born 1941), English classical organist
- Gillian Welch (born 1967), American singer
- Gillian White (born 1975), American actress
- Gillian Whitehead (born 1941), New Zealand composer
- Gillian Wright (born 1960), English actress

=== Surname ===
- Mike Gillian (born 1964), American basketball coach

== Arts, entertainment, and media ==
=== Fictional characters ===
- Gillian, in the novel Jill by Philip Larkin
- Gillian Andrassy, in the soap opera All My Children
- Gillian B. Loeb, in the DC universe
- Gillian Owens, in the novel and film Practical Magic
- Gillian Seed, the protagonist in the cyberpunk video game Snatcher
- Gillian Taylor, doctor in the 1986 film Star Trek IV: The Voyage Home

=== Other uses in arts, entertainment, and media ===
- "Gillian", a 1996 song on The Waifs (album) by the Australian folk group The Waifs
- Gillian, a novel by Frank Yerby

== See also ==
- Jill (disambiguation)
- Jillian
