= Stroudley =

Stroudley is a surname. Notable people with this surname include:

- Gillian Stroudley (1925–1992), English painter and printmaker
- James Stroudley (1906–1985), English painter and printmaker, the husband of Gillian
- William Stroudley (1833–1889), English railway engineer

== Other uses ==
- Stroudley (typeface)
