= Jillian =

Jillian is both a feminine given name and a surname. A spelling variant of Gillian, it originates as a feminine form of the given name Julian, Julio, Julius, and Julien.

Notable people with the name include:

== Given name ==
- Jillian Alexander (1968–2004), Canadian tennis player
- Jillian Alleyne (born 1994), American basketball player
- Jillian Armenante (born 1968), American television and film actress
- Jillian Armsbury (1962–2009), American singer-songwriter and activist
- Jillian Babin (born 1989), Canadian curler
- Jillian Bach (born 1973), American actress
- Jillian Rose Banks (born 1988), American musical artist
- Jillian Barberie (born 1966), Canadian-American tv hostess, sportscaster, radio personality and actress
- Jillian Bearden, American cyclist
- Jillian Beardwood (1934–2019), English mathematician
- Jillian Becker (born 1932), South African novelist
- Jillian Bell (born 1984), American comedian, actress, and screenwriter
- Jillian Broadbent (born 1948), Australian public figure and businesswoman
- Jillian Buriak, Canadian chemist
- Jillian Camarena-Williams (born 1982), American shot putter
- Jillian Cardarelli, American singer
- Jillian Cavanaugh, American anthropologist and academic administrator
- Jillian Christmas, Canadian poet
- Jillian Clare (born 1992), American actress and singer
- Jillian D'Alessio (born 1985), Canadian kayaker
- Jillian Dempsey (born 1991), American ice hockey player
- Jillian Edwards, American singer-songwriter
- Jillian Mai Thi Epperly (born c. 1973/4), creator of Jilly Juice
- Jillian Evans (born 1959), Welsh politician
- Jillian Fargey, Canadian actress
- Jillian Gallays (born 1986), Canadian freestyle wrestler
- Jillian Grace (born 1985), American model
- Jillian Hall (born 1980), American professional wrestler
- Jillian Harris (born 1979), Canadian television personality
- Jillian Hervey (born 1989), American dancer, singer, and vocalist
- Jillian Hunter, American author
- Jillian Jacqueline (born 1989), American singer
- Jillian Johnson, American politician and non-profit administrator
- Jillian Keiley, Canadian director
- Jillian Kesner-Graver (1950–2007), American actress and historian
- Jillian Kraus (born 1986), American water polo player
- Jillian Lane (1960–2013), British psychic
- Jillian Lauren (born 1973), American writer, performer and former escort
- Jillian Loyden (born 1985), American soccer player
- Jillian Mack (born 1957), English stage actress
- Jillian Mayer (born 1984), American performance artist
- Jillian McDonald, Canadian artist
- Jillian Medoff (born 1963), American writer
- Jillian Mele (born 1982), American news anchor and reporter
- Jillian Mercado (born 1987), American actress and model
- Jillian Michaels (born 1974), American exercise instructor
- Jillian Morgese (born 1989), American actress
- Jillian Murray (born 1989), American actress and model
- Jillian Nguyen (born 1992 or 1993), Australian actress
- Jillian Parry Fry (born 1982), American model and beauty queen
- Jillian Peterson, American scholar
- Jillian Patricia Pirtle (born 1983), American soprano, nonprofit executive, and beauty pageant winner
- Jillian Rose Reed (born 1991), American actress
- Jillian Reynolds (born 1966), Canadian actress
- Jillian Richardson (born 1965), Canadian athlete
- Jillian Roberts, Canadian child psychologist, author, and professor
- Jillian Rossi (born 1999), American singer-songwriter
- Jillian Schlesinger, American filmmaker
- Jillian Segal, Australian lawyer and business executive
- Jillian Skinner (born 1944), Australian politician
- Jillian Smith (born 1958), New Zealand field hockey player
- Jillian Speer (born 1979), American acoustic guitarist
- Jillian Sullivan (born 1957), New Zealand writer
- Jillian Tamaki (born 1980), Canadian-American illustrator and comic artist
- Jillian van Turnhout (born 1968), Irish activist and politician
- Jillian Vogtli (born 1973), American freestyle skier
- Jillian Ward (born 2005), Filipina actress, model and singer
- Jillian Weir (born 1993), Canadian hammer thrower
- Jillian Wheeler (born 1991), American singer-songwriter and actress
- Jillian Whiting, Australian journalist
- Jillian Williams (volleyball) (born 1997), American sitting volleyball player
- Jillian Wolgemuth (born 1998), American field hockey player
- Jillian York (born 1982), American activist, journalist and travel writer

== Surname ==
- Ann Jillian (born 1950), American actress

== Fictional Character ==
- Jillian Russell, a character from the American animated comedy franchise Family Guy
- Jillian Glopp, a main character from the American comedy television series, Killing It
- Jillian Grey, the main character from 1987 American motion picture, Sweet Revenge
- Jillian Pearlman, a character from the DC Comics franchise
- Jillian Pope, a character from the 2016 American action thriller film, Criminal

== See also ==
- Jillian's, a restaurant and arcade chain
- Jillian (I'd Give My Heart), a song and single by Within Temptation
- Gillian
