= Biology of Sex Differences =

- Subject: Sex differences
- Language: English
- Edited by: Jill Becker

Publication details
- History: 2010–present
- Publisher: BioMed Central
- Impact factor: 8.811 (2021)

Standard abbreviations
- ISO 4: Biol. Sex Differ.

Indexing
- ISSN: 2042-6410
- LCCN: 2010228569
- OCLC no.: 958732971

Links
- Journal homepage; Online archive

Biology of Sex Differences is an online-only open access scientific journal covering the biological basis of sex differences in humans and other animals. It was established in 2010 and is published by BioMed Central on behalf of the Organization for the Study of Sex Differences, of which it is the official journal, as well as the Society for Women's Health Research. The editor-in-chief is Jill Becker (University of Michigan). According to the Journal Citation Reports, the journal has a 2021 impact factor of 8.811.
