= Suitor (disambiguation) =

A suitor is a participant in a courtship.

Suitor or The Suitor may also refer to:

== Surname ==
- Fred W. Suitor (1879 –1934), American labor leader and politician
- Glen Suitor (born 1962), Canadian football player and sports broadcaster
- Harry D. Suitor (1904 – 1945), American lawyer and politician
- J. Jill Suitor (b. 1954), American professor of sociology

== Television and films ==
- The Suitor, a 1962 French comedy film
- The Suitor (Adventure Time), an episode of the television series
