= Beyond the Universe =

Beyond the Universe may refer to:

- Beyond the Universe: The Bill Pearl Story, an autobiography by the American bodybuilder Bill Pearl (1930–2022)
- "Beyond the Universe", a track on the 2023 album Hana by Sophie Ellis-Bextor
- Beyond the Universe (1981 film), starring Jacqueline Ray
- Beyond the Universe (2022 film), starring Henry Zaga
