= Medoff =

Medoff is a surname. Notable people with the surname include:

- Jillian Medoff (born 1963), American author
- Kara Medoff Barnett (born 1978), American business executive, theatre producer and arts administrator
- Mark Medoff (1940–2019), American playwright, screenwriter, film and theatre director, actor and professor
- Marshall Medoff (1945–2016), American economist
- Rafael Medoff (born c. 1959), American historian
