= Tom Selleck =

American actor (born 1945)

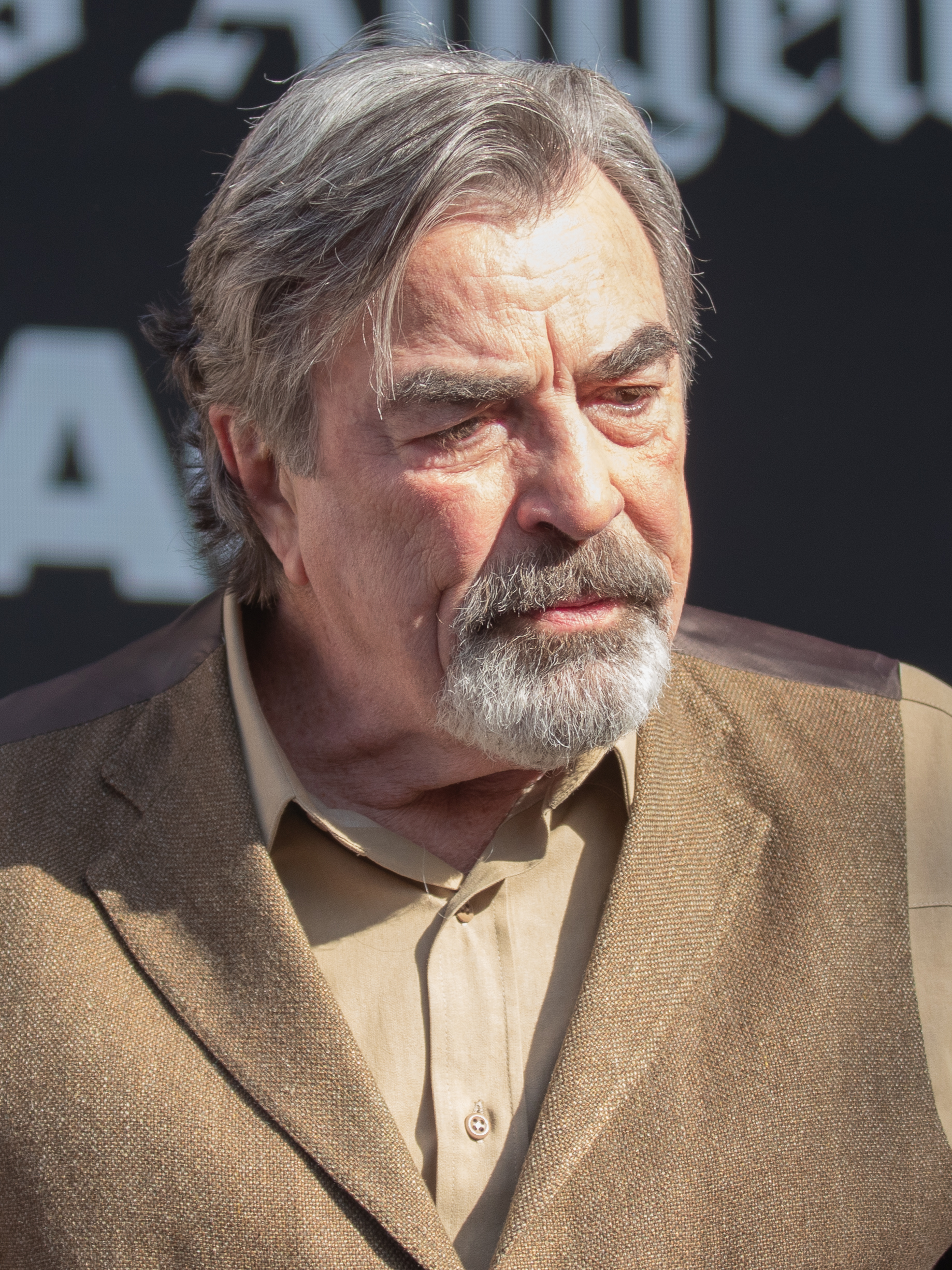
- Selleck in 2026
- Born: Thomas William Selleck; January 29, 1945 (age 81); Detroit, Michigan, U.S.
- Occupation: Actor
- Years active: 1965–present
- Political party: Independent
- Spouses: Jacqueline Ray (m. 1971; div. 1982) Jillie Mack (m. 1987)
- Children: 2
- Military service
- Branch: California Army National Guard
- Service years: 1967–1973
- Rank: Sergeant
- Units: Company C, 1st Battalion, 160th Infantry

Thomas William Selleck (/ˈsɛlɪk/; born January 29, 1945) is an American actor. His breakout role was playing private investigator Thomas Magnum in the television series Magnum, P.I. (1980–1988), for which he received five Emmy Award nominations for Outstanding Lead Actor in a Drama Series, winning in 1984. From 2010 to 2024, he portrayed NYC Police Commissioner Frank Reagan in Blue Bloods. From 2005 to 2015, he portrayed Jesse Stone in nine television films based on the Robert B. Parker novels.

In films, Selleck played bachelor architect Peter Mitchell in Three Men and a Baby (1987) and its sequel Three Men and a Little Lady (1990). He has also appeared in more than 50 other film and television roles since Magnum, P.I., including the films Quigley Down Under, Mr. Baseball, and Lassiter. He appeared in recurring television roles as Monica Geller's love interest Dr. Richard Burke in Friends, as Lance White, the naive private investigator on The Rockford Files, and as casino owner A. J. Cooper on Las Vegas. He also had a lead role in the television Western film The Sacketts, based on two of Louis L'Amour's books.

Selleck was a spokesman for the National Rifle Association of America, an endorser in advertisements for National Review magazine, and co-founder of the Character Counts! organization. He also served as an infantryman in the California Army National Guard from 1967 to 1973, attaining the rank of sergeant.

== Early life and education ==
Thomas William Selleck was born in Detroit, Michigan, on January 29, 1945, to housewife Martha Selleck (née Jagger) and Robert Dean Selleck, who was a real estate developer. He has an elder brother Robert, a younger sister Martha, and a younger brother Daniel.

Selleck is of mostly English descent, although he also has Irish and some German ancestry on his mother's side. Through a paternal line, Selleck is a direct descendant of English colonist David Selleck, who moved to Massachusetts from Somerset, England, in 1633. Through this line, Selleck is of the 11th generation of his family born in North America.

Selleck's family moved to Los Angeles in 1948, and lived in Sherman Oaks. He graduated from Grant High School in 1962 with future Monkees singer and actor Micky Dolenz and enrolled at Los Angeles Valley College, living at home and saving money. Selleck, who stands 6 feet 4 inches (1.93 m) tall, transferred to the University of Southern California during his junior year to play for the USC Trojans men's basketball team. He also was a pitcher and designated hitter for the USC baseball team. He is a member of Sigma Chi fraternity and a member of the Trojan Knights. While he was majoring in business administration, a drama coach suggested Selleck try acting, and in his senior year, he dropped out of the university. Selleck then studied acting at the Beverly Hills Playhouse, under Milton Katselas.

== Military service ==
Upon receiving a draft notice during the Vietnam War, Selleck enlisted in the California Army National Guard. He served in Company C, 1st Battalion, 160th Infantry from 1967 to 1973, attaining the rank of sergeant.

== Career ==
=== Early work ===
Magnum, P.I. publicity photo, 1980

Selleck's first television appearance was as a college senior on The Dating Game in 1965 and again on an episode that originally aired January 28, 1967, where he was in the first game and Bill Dana and Casey Kasem were in the second game. Soon after, he appeared in commercials for products such as Pepsi-Cola.

He began his career with bit parts in smaller movies, including Myra Breckinridge (invited on the set by Mae West), Coma, and The Seven Minutes. He appeared in a number of TV series, miniseries, and TV movies. He was also the face of Salem cigarettes and Revlon's Chaz cologne. Selleck appeared in a commercial for Right Guard deodorant in 1971, with Farrah Fawcett in 1972 for the aperitif Dubonnet, and another in 1977 for the toothpaste Close-Up. He was also in a Safeguard deodorant soap commercial (1972). In 1972, he starred in the B-movie Daughters of Satan. He had a recurring role in the 1970s as private investigator Lance White in The Rockford Files.

Selleck is an avid outdoorsman, marksman, and firearms collector. These interests led him to leading-man cowboy roles in Western films, starting with his role as cowboy and frontier marshal Orrin Sackett in the 1979 Louis L'Amour's books adaptation The Sacketts, opposite Sam Elliott, Jeff Osterhage, and Western legends Glenn Ford and Ben Johnson, and that same year, Concrete Cowboys with Jerry Reed. The Shadow Riders, another L'Amour adaptation with Selleck opposite Elliott and Osterhage, followed in 1982. Quigley Down Under is one of his best-known Western films, but his 1997 role in Last Stand at Saber River resulted in his winning a "Western Heritage Award".

=== 1980s: Magnum P.I. stardom ===
Selleck's big break came in 1980, when he was cast in the lead role as Thomas Magnum in Magnum, P.I. The producers would not release the actor for other projects, so Selleck had to pass on the role of Indiana Jones in Raiders of the Lost Ark, which meant that the role went to actor Harrison Ford, instead. The shooting of the pilot for Magnum turned out to be delayed for over six months by a writers' strike, which would have enabled him to complete Raiders.

Look, I made a deal with Magnum, and it was the best thing that ever happened to me. I'm proud that I lived up to my contract, and some people said, "You've got to get into a car and drive into a brick wall and get injured and get out of Magnum and do [Raiders]." I said, "I gotta look my mom and dad in the eye, and we don't do that," so I did Magnum... That's not so bad, is it?

— Tom Selleck • Build Series Interview

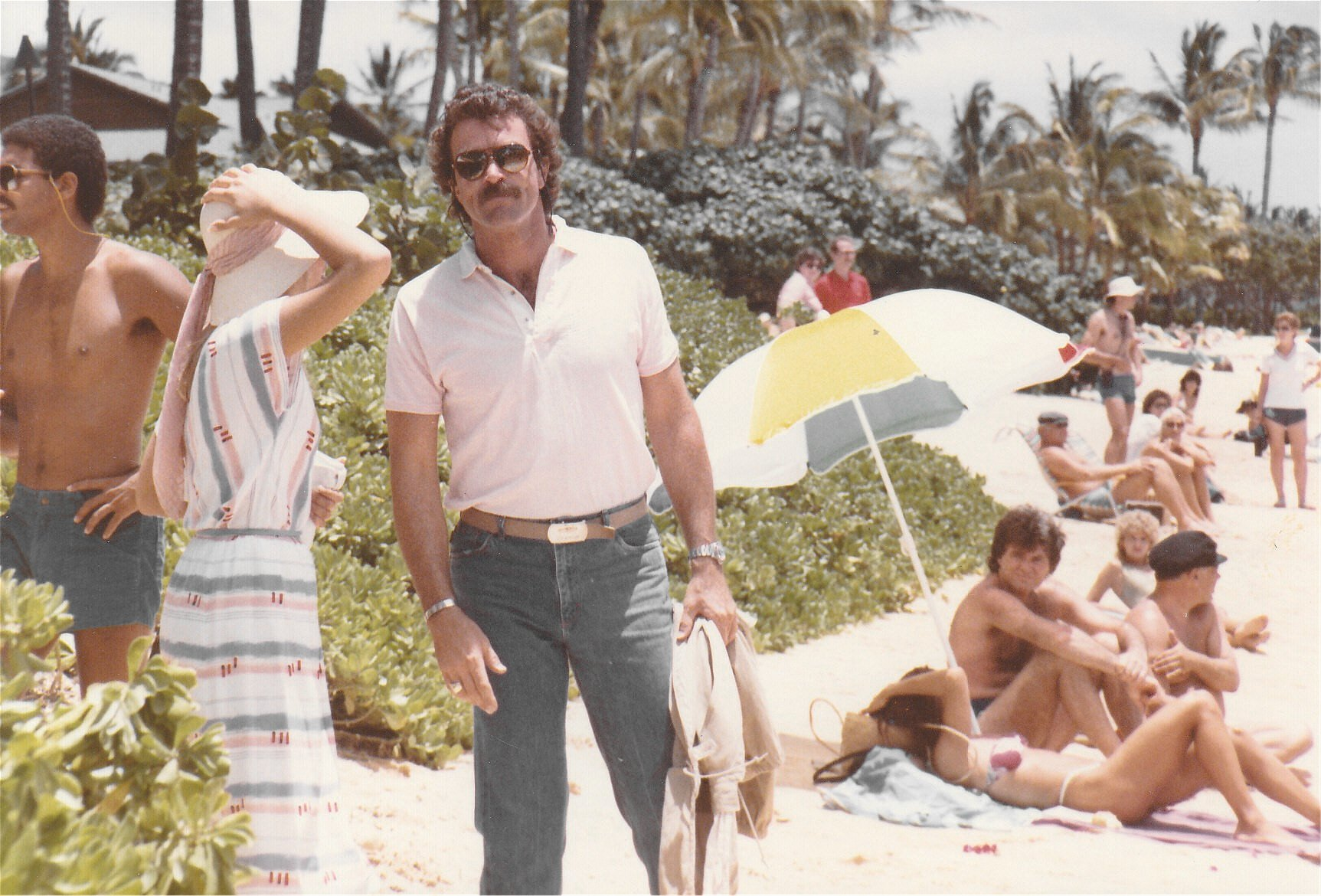
Selleck on the set of Magnum in 1984

Selleck played the role of Thomas Magnum in 1980 after filming six other TV pilots that were never sold. Magnum was a former U.S. Navy SEAL officer who had served in the Vietnam War; after the war, Magnum had been in the "Naval Intelligence Agency" (a fictional version of the Office of Naval Intelligence) and then resigned from the Navy to become a private investigator living in Hawaii. The show continued until 1988, lasting eight seasons and 163 episodes, winning him an Emmy Award for Outstanding Lead Actor in a Drama Series in 1984.

As Magnum, Selleck was famous for his mustache, a Hawaiian-style aloha shirt, a Detroit Tigers baseball cap, and driving an open-top Ferrari 308 GTS in the series. After the end of the show in 1988, it established itself as the top-rated, one-hour show in the history of syndicated reruns (at least until 1998).

In 1984, he introduced Nancy Reagan at the 1984 Republican National Convention.

Selleck was offered the lead role of Mitch Buchannon in Baywatch, but he turned it down because he did not want to be seen as a sex symbol. The role eventually went to David Hasselhoff.

During the Magnum years, Selleck starred in several films including as a cat burglar in 1930s London in Lassiter and an acrophobic police detective in Runaway (both 1984), and as a stand-in father in Three Men and a Baby, which was the biggest hit at the American box office in 1987. In 1989, he ended the decade by starring in the romantic comedy Her Alibi and crime drama An Innocent Man.

=== 1990s and 2000s: TV, film, and advertising ===
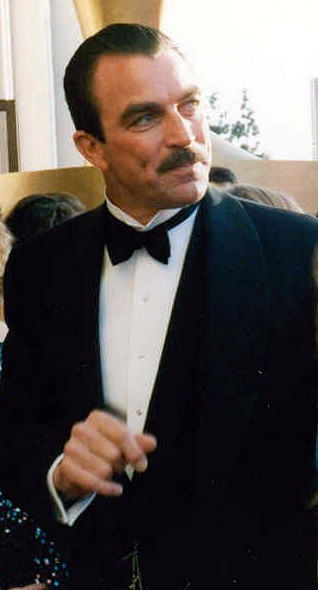
Selleck on the Red Carpet at the 61st Annual Academy Awards in 1989

In 1990, he starred as an American 19th-century sharpshooter in the Australian Western Quigley Down Under, a role and film that he considers one of his best. During the 1990s, he also starred in Three Men and a Little Lady (1990), Folks! (1992), Christopher Columbus: The Discovery (1992), Mr. Baseball (1992), In & Out (1997) and The Love Letter (1999). Selleck's role in In & Out is his first as a gay character (Peter Malloy).

He did the voice-over for the 1993 AT&T advertising campaigns titled "You Will". These advertisements had a futuristic feel, and posed the question: "What if you had the technology to _____? Well, you will ... and the company that will bring it to you? AT&T."

In the mid-1990s, Selleck played the role of Richard Burke, Monica Geller's older boyfriend, beginning at the end of the second season of the TV series Friends. Richard was a divorced ophthalmologist, who was a friend of Monica's parents. At first, the relationship was hidden from her parents. The relationship eventually ended over Richard's reluctance to commit to having children, though Selleck did make a few more appearances in later episodes. His decision to star in a six-episode plot of Friends was seen as a digression from the movies back to TV shows and a mistake by his career advisers. Selleck recruited a new agent and accepted the part. This role earned him an Emmy Award nomination in 2000 for Outstanding Guest Actor in a Comedy Series.

Also, in the mid-1990s, Selleck hosted a special series on TLC called The Practical Guide to the Universe, in which he talked about the stars, planets, galaxies, etc.

In February 1998, he accepted the lead role in a sitcom for CBS called The Closer. This role was his big comeback on primetime TV. In it, he played Jack McLaren, a legendary publicist heading up a brand-new marketing firm. His costars included Ed Asner, David Krumholtz, and Penelope Ann Miller. Despite the high pedigree, and the expectations for Selleck's first series since Magnum, P.I., low ratings caused the show to be canceled after 10 episodes.

His last two cowboy roles to date were in the 2001 TNT movie Crossfire Trail (based on a Louis L'Amour novel of the same name), and the 2003 motion picture Monte Walsh. In 2001, Selleck played the lead role of Murray in a Broadway revival of Herb Gardner's comedic play A Thousand Clowns. The production toured for four months, playing in North Carolina, Chicago, and Boston before opening on Broadway at the Longacre Theatre. Critics, though far from uniformly negative about Selleck's performance, generally compared it unfavorably to that of Jason Robards, who won awards in the 1960s for playing the character on the stage and in a movie version. The production closed as a result of the attacks on 9/11.

Selleck played the role of General Dwight D. Eisenhower in A&E's 2004 made-for-TV movie Ike: Countdown to D-Day. The movie showed the planning, politics, and preparation for the 1944 invasion of Normandy, and Selleck was critically lauded for playing a cool, calm Eisenhower.

Since 2005, Selleck has starred in the role of transplanted lawman Jesse Stone in a series of made-for-TV movies based on Robert B. Parker's novels. To date, the series comprises nine films, with the most recent released in October 2015. In addition to his portrayal of the films' protagonist, Selleck now acts as producer for the series. The fifth film, Jesse Stone: Thin Ice, was not adapted from Parker's novels, but was instead an original story by Selleck.

In 2006, Selleck appeared in a recurring role on the acclaimed ABC drama Boston Legal as Ivan Tiggs, the troubled ex-husband of Shirley Schmidt (Candice Bergen). He voiced the character of Cornelius Robinson in the animated film Meet the Robinsons (2007).

Selleck joined the cast of the NBC drama Las Vegas in the fifth and final season premiere on September 28, 2007. He played A. J. Cooper, the new owner of the Montecito Casino. He replaced James Caan, who left the cast in the same episode. This was Selleck's first regular role in a drama show since he played Thomas Magnum in Magnum, P.I. As of December 30, 2007, he began doing commercial voice-overs for Florida's Natural orange juice.

=== 2010s and 2020s: Blue Bloods and continued success ===
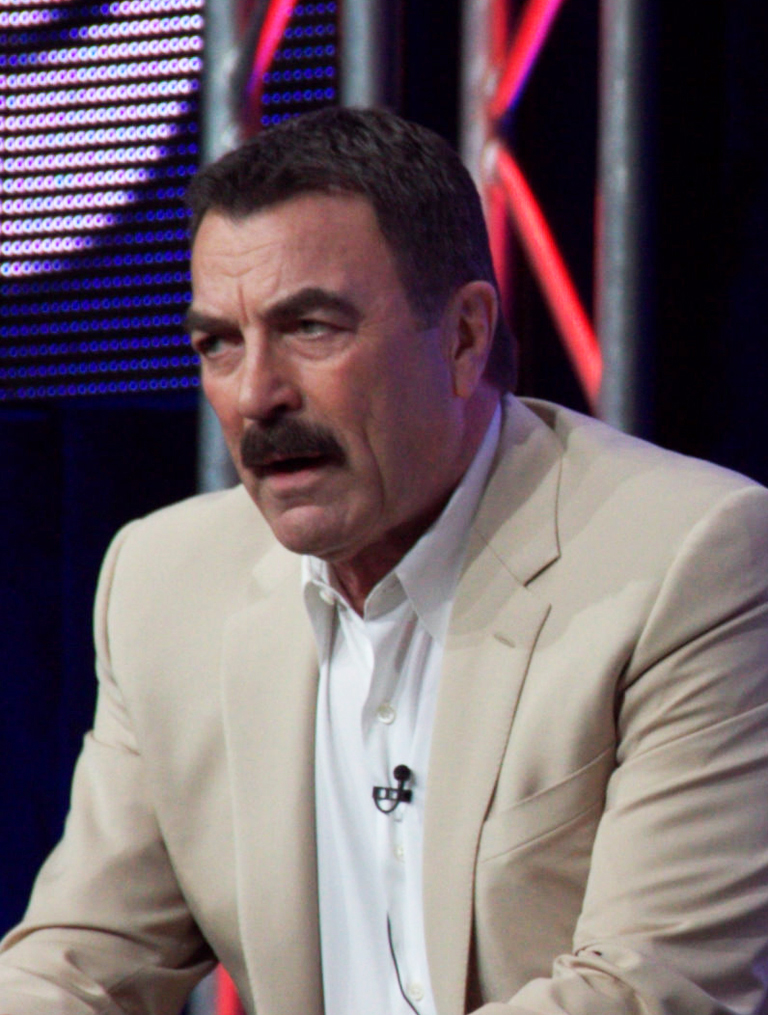
Selleck at the 2010 Summer Session of the Television Critics Association

In 2010, Selleck was cast as NYC Police Commissioner Frank Reagan in the CBS American police procedural/drama series Blue Bloods, filmed on location in New York City. The series followed the Reagan family of law enforcement officers with the New York City Police Department and the Manhattan district attorney's office. It premiered on September 24, 2010, and ended its run on December 13, 2024.

Selleck played the role of Mr. Kornfeldt in the comedy movie Killers (2010). In 2012, Selleck was featured in Coldwell Banker's television ad campaign focusing on homeownership. In 2016, he became the pitchman for reverse-mortgage lender American Advisors Group.

In 2021, Selleck made his album debut singing "Yessir, That's My Baby" with Nicolas King (recorded live in 2001 during their run of A Thousand Clowns) on King's album Act One released by Club44 Records.

== Personal life ==
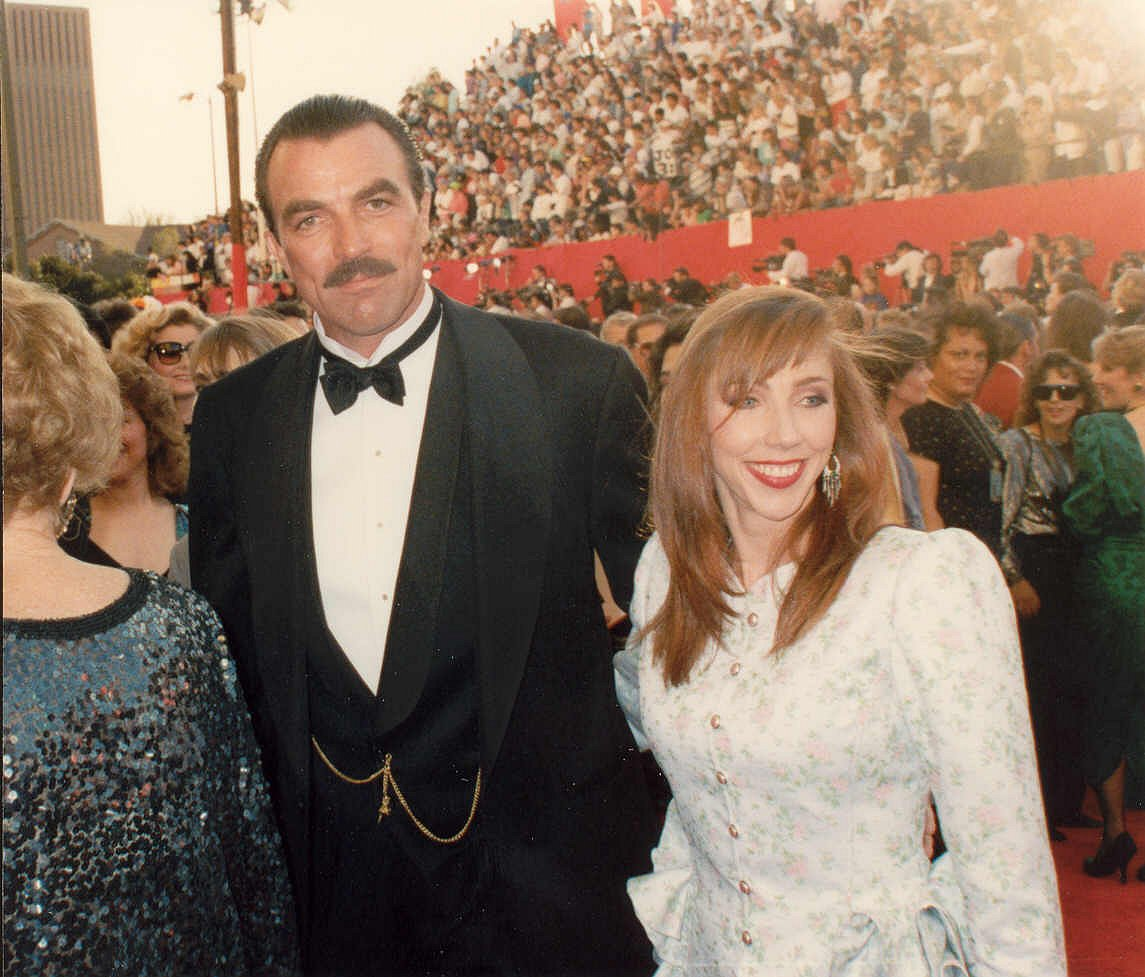
Selleck and wife Jillie Mack in 1989

From 1971 to 1982, Selleck was married to model Jacqueline Ray. During that time, he adopted her son, Kevin Shepard (born 1966), who went on to be the drummer for the American rock band Tonic. On August 7, 1987, Selleck married Jillie Mack, whom he met in Britain. They have one daughter, who was born in 1988.

Selleck has said he is Episcopalian.

Selleck and his family live near Thousand Oaks-Westlake Village, California, on a 60-acre (24 ha) avocado ranch in Hidden Valley formerly owned by Dean Martin. In a 2012 interview with People, Selleck talked about living and working on his ranch: "So I like to get outside and work on the ranch, from fixing roads to clearing brush. I hate going to the gym, so sweating outdoors sure beats sitting on a stationary bike staring at my navel. And I work cheaper than anyone I could hire to do it."

He has said that he does not personally use text messages or email.

Selleck is an indoor and beach volleyball player, playing the outside hitter position for the Outrigger Canoe Club, Honolulu. (Note: His son Kevin attended Selleck's alma mater, USC, and became a volleyball team All-American in 1990.) Outrigger Canoe Club teammate Dennis Berg said of Selleck, "Tom was a great teammate, appreciative of being included with such a talented and experienced group, practicing and playing hard when his Magnum schedule permitted. ... He was very patient with all of us, and we relished the big crowds that replaced the usual sparse number of players' friends and spouses at the national tourney matches."

Selleck is an ice hockey fan and has attended Los Angeles Kings games at Staples Center. He lists Anže Kopitar and Alexander Frolov as two of his favorite players. He was once a minority owner of the Detroit Tigers, his favorite baseball team since childhood. In 1986, Selleck hit a batting-practice home run while working out with the Tigers. In preparation for his role in the film Mr. Baseball, Selleck reached out to the Tigers to practice with them during the spring of 1991. He took batting practice for three weeks, even making an appearance in an exhibition game against Cincinnati, where Tiger manager Sparky Anderson put him into a game as a pinch hitter. He managed to foul off three pitches from Reds pitcher Tim Layana before striking out. Selleck believes his training helped him considerably in his film role, having gained valuable experience from attending team meetings and developing an understanding of how competitive players function together.

In February 2009, Selleck joined the Vietnam Veterans Memorial Fund as national spokesman for the new Education Center being built on the National Mall.

Upon James Garner's death in 2014, he said, "Jim was a mentor to me and a friend, and I will miss him." Two years after Garner's death, Selleck said, prior to filming the sixth season of Blue Bloods: "It's kind of like my mentor, who never wanted to hear he was my mentor [James Garner], I don't accept the mentor role. That they feel that way is, I think flattering although it adds a certain amount of pressure."

=== 2015 water lawsuit ===
Selleck was sued by the Calleguas Municipal Water District for allegedly improperly transferring about 1.4 million U.S. gallons (5.3 million liters) of water from the Calleguas Municipal Water District to the Hidden Valley Municipal Water District during the driest California drought since record-keeping began; he used the water to water his avocado farm. He settled the suit by paying $21,685.55 to the Calleguas Municipal Water District, an amount which represented the district's private investigator fees in connection with the case.

== Political views ==
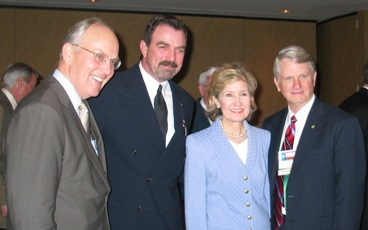
Senator Larry Craig, Selleck, Senator Kay Bailey Hutchison, and Senator Zell Miller at the 2005 NRA Annual Convention in Houston.

Selleck has been a member of the board of directors of the National Rifle Association (NRA) and served as a spokesman for the organization. He resigned from the board on September 18, 2018, though he remained a member of the organization. After his close friend Charlton Heston stepped down from his role as an NRA spokesman in 2003, Selleck succeeded him. In 2002, Selleck donated the rifle he used in Quigley Down Under (a custom 13-pound [5.9 kg] single-shot 1874 Sharps Rifle with a 34-inch [86 cm] barrel), along with six other firearms from his other films, to the NRA. The firearms are part of the NRA's exhibit "Real Guns of Reel Heroes" at the National Firearms Museum in Fairfax, Virginia.

To promote his film The Love Letter, Selleck was invited to be on The Rosie O'Donnell Show on May 19, 1999. During the appearance, O'Donnell questioned Selleck about his support of gun ownership and an ad in which he appeared supporting the NRA. At the end of the interview, Selleck stated, "It's your show and you can talk about it after I leave." Selleck later confided to Shaun Robinson: "I still like Rosie. I think she needs to take a deep breath and stop thinking everybody who disagrees with her is evil." In 2000, Selleck stated he has always been interested in politics as he finds it "fascinating".

For a number of years, Selleck appeared in television advertising for National Review. He also subscribes to The New Republic. Selleck describes himself as "a registered independent with a lot of libertarian leanings".

In the 2016 presidential election, Selleck did not support either Hillary Clinton or Donald Trump, instead writing in former Dallas Police Department Chief David Brown, saying that he was deeply touched by the grace and leadership Brown showed through the 2016 Dallas police shooting.

Blue Bloods co-star Abigail Hawk said Selleck often keeps his opinions to himself, but tries to form his views by reading news sources from across the opinion spectrum and likes to focus on the facts of a situation. "He always took the most left-wing news source, and then a right-wing news source, and read them both, researched the entire spectrum, and then made his decision based on all of that information", Hawk said.

== Awards and honors ==
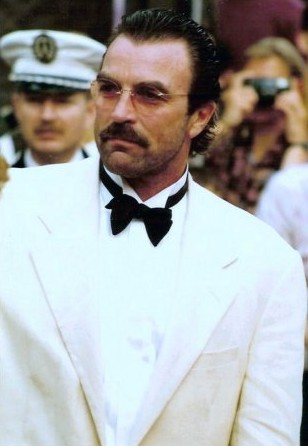
Selleck at the 1992 Cannes Film Festival

On April 28, 2000, Selleck received an honorary doctorate degree from Pepperdine University. He was chosen because of his outstanding character and ethic. He is a board member of the non-profit Joseph and Edna Josephson Institute of Ethics and co-founder of the Character Counts Coalition. He received a Star on the Hollywood Walk of Fame in 1986. The star is situated at 6925 Hollywood Blvd. In 1989, he received the Golden Plate Award of the American Academy of Achievement.

Year	Association	Category	Work	Result
1981	People's Choice Awards	Favorite Actor in a New TV Series	Magnum, P.I.	Won
1982	Golden Globe Awards	Best Actor – Television Series Drama	Magnum, P.I.	Nominated
1982	Primetime Emmy Awards	Outstanding Lead Actor in a Drama Series	Magnum, P.I.	Nominated
1983	Golden Globe Awards	Best Actor – Television Series Drama	Magnum, P.I.	Nominated
1983	People's Choice Awards	Favorite Male TV Performer	Magnum, P.I.	Won
1983	Primetime Emmy Awards	Primetime Emmy Award for Outstanding Lead Actor in a Drama Series	Magnum, P.I.	Nominated
1984	Golden Globe Awards	Golden Globe Award for Best Actor – Television Series Drama	Magnum, P.I.	Nominated
1984	People's Choice Awards	People's Choice for Favorite Male TV Performer	Magnum, P.I.	Won
1984	Primetime Emmy Awards	Primetime Emmy Award for Outstanding Lead Actor in a Drama Series	Magnum, P.I.	Won
1985	Golden Globe Awards	Golden Globe Award for Best Actor – Television Series Drama	Magnum, P.I.	Won
1985	People's Choice Awards	People's Choice Awards Favorite Male TV Performer	Magnum, P.I.	Won
1985	Primetime Emmy Awards	Primetime Emmy Award for Outstanding Lead Actor in a Drama Series	Magnum, P.I.	Nominated
1986	Golden Globe Awards	Golden Globe Award for Best Actor – Television Series Drama	Magnum, P.I.	Nominated
1986	Primetime Emmy Awards	Primetime Emmy Award for Outstanding Lead Actor in a Drama Series	Magnum, P.I.	Nominated
1987	Golden Globe Awards	Best Actor – Television Series Drama	Magnum, P.I.	Nominated
1988	Golden Globe Awards	Best Actor – Television Series Drama	Magnum, P.I.	Nominated
1993	Golden Raspberry Awards	Worst Actor	Folks!	Nominated
1993	Golden Raspberry Awards	Worst Actor	Christopher Columbus: The Discovery	Won
1998	Blockbuster Entertainment Awards	Favorite Supporting Actor – Comedy	In & Out	Nominated
1998	MTV Movie Awards	Best Kiss (shared with Kevin Kline)	In & Out	Nominated
2000	Primetime Emmy Awards	Outstanding Guest Actor in a Comedy Series	Friends	Nominated
2005	People's Choice Awards	Favorite TV Icon	Himself	Nominated
2007	Primetime Emmy Awards	Outstanding Lead Actor in a Limited Series or Movie	Jesse Stone: Sea Change	Nominated
2007	Satellite Awards	Best Actor – Miniseries or Television Film	Jesse Stone: Sea Change	Nominated
2017	People's Choice Awards	Favorite Crime TV Drama Actor	Blue Bloods	Nominated
