= Gillian Small =

American biologist

Gillian Small is currently a consultant in higher education leadership and scientific research. Previously (2022-2024)she was the president of World Science U, the higher education arm of World Science Festival.

She was the University Provost & Senior Vice President for Academic Affairs at Fairleigh Dickinson University from 2016 through 2022.

Prior to that, she served as the Vice Chancellor for Research at the City University of New York.

Small received her PhD in the Biological Sciences in 1983 from Wolverhampton Polytechnic - now the University of Wolverhampton in England, where she also completed her undergraduate education in the Biological Sciences. She moved to the US in 1985 to conduct postdoctoral research at the Rockefeller University in New York, in the laboratory of Nobel Laureate Christian DeDuve, a cytologist and biochemist. Small's research focus is organelle biogenesis and molecular regulation of lipid metabolism; she has published and lectured widely in this area.

Previously, Small served on the faculty at the University of Florida (1988), where she led her own independent research program to study peroxisome biogenesis and the molecular regulation of lipid metabolism. In 1992, she became a faculty member at Mount Sinai School of Medicine in New York, where she directed a laboratory as well as served as Director of the Interdisciplinary Graduate Program in Molecular, Cellular, and Developmental Biology.

At CUNY, Small was instrumental in redesigning doctoral education in the sciences and in enhancing the university's scientific research infrastructure. She established CUNY's first Postdoctoral Program for postdoctoral fellows across the university and the Technology Commercialization office. She also played a key role in establishing several new research institutes, and both envisioned and developed a new CUNY Advanced Science Research Center.
