= Jill Konrath =

American business writer

- Education: University of Minnesota - Twin Cities
- Occupations: Sales strategist, speaker and author
- Notable work: Selling to Big Companies, SNAP Selling
- Website: www.jillkonrath.com

Jill Konrath is a sales strategist, speaker and the author of the sales books Selling to Big Companies and SNAP Selling.

== Education and career ==
Jill Konrath graduated from the University of Minnesota - Twin Cities. With a degree in education, she began her career as a high school teacher. Wanting to leave teaching, she got a job in sales at Xerox. She then moved into computer sales before launching the sales consulting firm Leapfrog Strategies, Inc. in 1987 In 2007, she launched Sales Shebang, an online resource for women who work in sales and marketing.

Konrath has served on the board of advisors for SaleGene, a marketing technology startup. In 2006, SalesGene changed its name to Landslide Technologies, taking its name from an app that it developed. Landslide Technologies was acquired by j2 Global in 2012. In 2013, Konrath conducted a survey of professionals involved in sales regarding their use of LinkedIn as a sales tool. Of the more than 3,000 people surveyed, she reported findings that only 5% were using it to its full capabilities, while 55% were not using it all. Utilizing the results of this survey, she published her 2013 eBook, Cracking the LinkedIn Sales Code.

== Writing and speaking ==
In addition to her print publications, Konrath has written a series of eBooks, sales kits, study kits and webinars related to sales. She has also been consulted in publications including Forbes and the New York Times.

=== Selling to Big Companies ===
In 2005, Konrath published Selling to Big Companies. A sales manual for getting business with large corporate clients, Selling to Big Companies deals with challenges faced in the changing market, with strategies for salespeople to get in touch with executives who make sales decisions. The book has been on Amazon's Top 20 Sales Book list since 2006. In 2008, Selling to Big Companies was named one of Fortune's 8 Must-reads for Sellers. Inc. named it one of the Top 10 "How to Sell" Books of All Time. It also won a gold medal at the Sales Book Awards in the Classic Sales Books category, and was named one of the 20 best business and sales books by SalesHQ.

=== Get Back to Work Faster: The Ultimate Job Seeker's Guide ===
In 2009, Konrath released Get Back to Work Faster: The Ultimate Job Seeker's Guide, a system of strategies intended to help job seekers find employment in a troubled economy. Along with the book, she launched the Get Back to Work Faster Initiative, which included a website and free webinar series to accompany the book.

=== SNAP Selling ===
In 2010, Konrath released SNAP Selling: Speed Up Sales and Win More Business with Today's Frazzled Customers. Written from the perspective of the mid of a busy customer, the book is intended as a guide to getting busy customers to stop and pay attention to sales messages.

SNAP Selling became the number one sales book on Amazon "within hours of its release". It was named one of the Top 10 Books About Sales by Small Business Trends, and one of 2010's Best Business Books by Soundview. The book received a silver medal in the Top Sales Book category at the 2010 Top Sales & Marketing Awards by Top Sales World. It was also named one of the Best Sales and Business Books of 2010 by the RAIN Group, as well as one of the Top Social Media & Marketing Books of 2010 by Webbiquity. In 2011, SNAP Selling was named to Selling Power Magazine's list of the Best Books to Help Your Team Succeed.

=== Agile Selling ===
Konrath's fourth book, Agile Selling: Get Up to Speed Quickly in Today’s Ever-Changing Sales World, was released on May 29, 2014.

== Bibliography ==
=== Books ===
- Jill Konrath, Selling to Big Companies, Kaplan Publishing, 2005
- Jill Konrath, Get Back to Work Faster: The Ultimate Job Seeker's Guide, 3 Palms Publishing Group, LLC, 2009
- Jill Konrath, SNAP Selling: Speed Up Sales and Win More Business with Today's Frazzled Customers, Penguin, 2010

=== eBooks ===
- Selling in a Volatile Economy
- LinkedIn Sales Secrets Revealed
- Cracking the LinkedIn Sales Code
- The Ultimate Guide to Email Prospecting

=== Contributor ===
- Ivan Misner, Masters of Sales, Entrepreneur Press, 2007
- Michael Dalton Johnson, Top Dog Sales Secrets, Penny Union Corp, 2007
- Eric Taylor, David Riklan, Mastering the World of Selling: The Ultimate Training Resource from the Biggest Names in Sales, Wiley, 2010
- Michael Dalton Johnson, Top Dog Recession-Busting Sales Secrets, Penny Union Corp, 2010

== Awards ==
Konrath was named to the Sales Lead Management Association's lists of the 50 Most Influential People in Sales Lead Management in 2009, 2010, 2011 and 2012. In 2010, she was awarded a gold in the Top Sales Personality category at the Top Sales & Marketing Awards by Top Sales World as well as a silver medal in the Top Sales Blog category. At the 2011 awards, she was awarded a bronze medal in the category of Top Sales and Marketing Thought Leader.

She received an honorable mention at the 2011 Small Business Influencers awards. InsideView named her to their lists of the 25 Influential Leaders in Sales in 2011 and 2012. In 2012, Success magazine named Konrath to its list of 21 Sales Stars in North America. She was also named one of the Top 25 Sales Influencers for 2012 by OpenView Lab. In 2012, she was named to Tops Sales World's Top Sales & Marketing Hall of Fame. In 2013, InsideView named her to their list of the 25 Influential Leaders in Sales for the third consecutive year.
