= Gillian Porter =

Northern Irish television presenter (born 1965)

Gillian Porter (born 13 April 1965 in Coleraine) is a Northern Irish television presenter. She is best known for her work at UTV, where she was a long-serving continuity announcer and newsreader for 27 years.

== Broadcasting career ==
Before joining UTV, Porter briefly worked as a continuity announcer and playout director at BBC Northern Ireland. In 1998, she presented the first series of UTV Life (originally broadcast weekly on Sundays before becoming a weeknight show).

In later years, Porter was one of two out-of-vision announcers at UTV, alongside Julian Simmons, voicing pre-recorded links.

In April 2020, local continuity was abandoned, initially as a temporary measure, due to the impact of the COVID-19 pandemic on staff at the Belfast studios. In November 2020, Porter announced she had left UTV, following a decision to switch permanently to ITV network presentation.

Porter voiced the final local UTV continuity link, broadcast at 5:59am on Thursday 2 April 2020.

She is now a freelance broadcaster and voiceover artist.

== Personal life ==
Porter is married to Dee Corbett and has two children.
