= Jill F. Johnstone =

Canadian ecologist

- Citizenship: United States, Canada
- Education: Ph.D. University of Alaska M.S. University of British Columbia B.A. Middlebury College
- Awards: named a Women Leader in Fire Science
- Scientific career
- Fields: disturbance ecology, northern ecosystems
- Website: http://npelusask.weebly.com/

Jill Johnstone was a professor in the Department of Biology at the University of Saskatchewan, where she started the Northern Plant Ecology Lab (NPEL) which she still runs. She primarily conducts research on plant ecology and environmental biology with an emphasis on how boreal forest and tundra are responding to rapid rates of climate change.

== Early life and education ==
Johnstone was born and raised in Vermont having both U.S.A. and Canadian citizenship. Her interest in northern ecosystems developed while studying at Middlebury College, where she earned her B.A. in 1992, majoring in Northern Studies. Three years later in 1995, she received her Masters in Science in Biogeography at the University of British Columbia. Soon after she began her professional career by becoming a self-employed environmental consultant performing contract work for several institutions including the Canadian Wildlife Service, the University of Alaska Fairbanks, the Yukon Territorial Government Renewable Resources, and the Indian and Northern Affairs Canada. She earned her Ph.D. in Ecology at the University of Alaska at Fairbanks under her supervisor F. Stuart Chapin III in 2003.

At the University of Saskatchewan, she taught undergraduate and graduate courses in community ecology, environmental biology, and statistics since 2006. Currently, the greater majority of her work specializes in the dynamics of forest and tundra in the mountainous regions of Alaska and Yukon, as well as flatter landscapes in northern Saskatchewan and NWT. She lives in Canada where she continues her active northern research program as a freelance researcher based close to Whitehorse, Yukon.

== Research and career ==
Her current work is an extension of her graduate studies. While working towards her Ph.D. in Biology, Johnstone began publishing more peer-reviewed publications such as her 2002 study which studied the variations in plant forage quality in the Porcupine Caribou Herd. She has continued publishing while becoming a post-doctoral research fellow at Carleton University and eventually a professor in the Department of Biology and the University of Saskatchewan. As of this time her most recent publication has been a study of ecological memory and forest resilience. Her study has helped uncover how ecosystems respond to disturbances and are maintained by the legacies of information and material.

Johnstone's research at the Northern Plant Ecology lab focuses on how changes in natural ecosystem disturbances such as the severity and frequency of fires influence forests and their response to climate change. Johnstone studies these changes by observing the effects of climate change that cause changes in the processes of plant regeneration and colonization. This specifically includes a study of what types biotic and abiotic interactions are responsible for the different species likelihood of successful succession after a community assembly. She correlates this focus to climate warming by studying how migrating southern species may take advantage of natural disturbances by invading northern communities during regrowth. She connects her findings to predict future changes in northern ecosystems and what these new interactions mean for management of human disturbances. Her lab's success is acknowledged by the seven years of funding support from various funding agencies to herself and her students (amounting to more than $350,000).

== Awards and recognition ==
- named a Women Leader in Fire Science
