= James Stroudley =

English painter

James Stroudley, A.R.C.A (1906–1985) was an English painter and printmaker.

== Life and work ==
James was born on 17 June 1906 and lived in London. He Studied at Clapham School of Art between 1923 and 1927, and then The Royal College of Art 1927–30, his teachers included William Rothenstein and Allan Gwynne-Jones.

He married the fashion artist, designer and writer Phyllis Stroudley, they had one son. He later married Gillian Stroudley (née Thain), they had two sons and one daughter.

He died in May 1985, at Wandsworth, London.

== Exhibitions ==
1957 John Moores Liverpool Exhibition, Walker Art Gallery. Dec57 to Jan56. Showed at RA, RBA, RE and elsewhere. Arthur Tooth and Son and Apollinaire Gallery gave him solo shows. An exhibition Recent paintings by James Stroudley was held at the Reid Gallery, London between 24 August–10 September in 1960.

== Collections ==
Public collections in Bradford, Brighton, Coventry and Rochdale hold examples of his work.
