= Jacqueline Ray =

American actress

- Born: July 17, 1952 (age 74); Burbank, California, U.S.
- Occupations: Actress, Model
- Years active: 1967–2007
- Spouses: Tom Selleck (m. 1971; div. 1982); Clarence Barry Witmer (m. 1992)
- Children: 1

Jacqueline Ray (born July 17, 1952) is an American former actress and model, who became known for her performance in the movies In Like Flint and Beyond the Universe, and in the television show Magnum, P.I..

== Career ==
Ray booked her first role in the movie In Like Flint. She starred in two further movies The Killings at Outpost Zeta (1980) and Beyond The Universe (1981), and also appeared in the American drama series Magnum, P.I.. In 2006 she earned a role in the teen TV show Unfabulous and its spin-off Unfabulous: The Best Trip Ever.

== Personal life ==
Ray married three times. She was married to actor Tom Selleck on May 15, 1971. However, after 11 years, she filed for divorce. While she later played alongside Selleck in Magnum, P.I., in March 1992, she married for the third time, to Clarence Barry Witmer.

== Filmography ==
=== Television ===
Year	Title	Role	Episode	Notes
1973	Marcus Welby, M.D.	Model	The Endless Moment	
1981	Magnum, P.I.	Lisa	J. "Digger" Doyle	(as Jacquelyn Ray)
1983	Magnum, P.I.	Ms. Roebuck	Birdman of Budapest	(as Jacquelyn Selleck)
1983	Dallas	Marie Walker	Tangled Web	(as Jacquelyn Ray Selleck)
1983	Matt Houston	Margot	Butterfly	(as Jacquelyn Selleck)
1984	Mike Hammer	Dr. Marcia Forrest	Shots in the Dark	(as Jaquelyn Ray Selleck)
2007	Unfabulous	Dancer	The Best Trip Ever: Part 2	

=== Film ===
Year	Title	Role	Notes
1967	In Like Flint	Denise	(as Jacki Ray)
1967	The Gnome-Mobile	Gnome Maiden	(uncredited)
1973	Frasier the Sensuous Lion		(as Jacki Ray)
1980	The Killings at Outpost Zeta	Linda	
1981	Beyond the Universe		
