= Jillian Bearden =

American cyclist

Jillian Bearden is an American cyclist and co-founder of the U.S. Trans National Women’s Cycling Team.

== Career ==
In 2016, she won the Arizona El Tour de Tucson and was the first trans woman to race in an American professional peloton in 2017.
