= Jill Koshiol =

American cancer epidemiologist

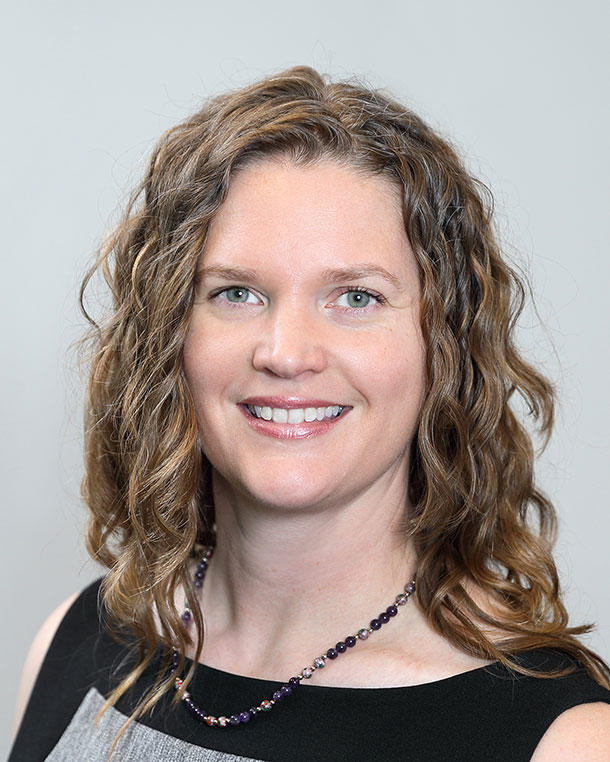
- Education: UNC Gillings School of Global Public Health
- Scientific career
- Fields: Cancer epidemiology
- Workplaces: National Cancer Institute
- Website: jillkoshiol.com

Jill E. Koshiol is an American cancer epidemiologist who researches the risk factors of hepatobiliary cancers. She is a senior investigator in the infections and immunoepidemiology branch at the National Cancer Institute.

== Life ==
Koshiol received a Ph.D. in epidemiology from the UNC Gillings School of Global Public Health in 2005. Her dissertation was titled, Effect of smoking and human papillomavirus (HPV) type on time to clearance of HPV infection among HIV-seropositive and HIV-seronegative women. Jane C. Schroeder was her doctoral advisor. In 2005, Koshiol joined the National Cancer Institute (NCI)'s genetic epidemiology branch of the division of cancer epidemiology and genetics as a cancer prevention fellow.

Koshiol joined the NCI infections and immunoepidemiology branch as a research fellow in 2008, became an Earl Stadtman Tenure-Track Investigator in 2010, and was awarded National Institutes of Health (NIH) scientific tenure and promoted to senior investigator in 2020. Koshiol received the Hubert H. Humphrey Award for Service to America in 2022. She researches hepatobiliary cancers and identifies risk factors, such as aflatoxin.

== See also ==
- List of University of North Carolina at Chapel Hill alumni
