= Jill W. Smith =

American philanthropist

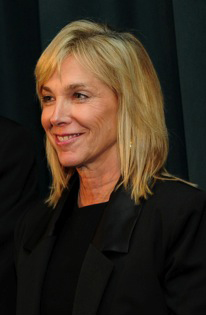
Jill W. Smith

Jill W. Smith (born October 7, 1953) is a philanthropist with a longstanding interest in advancing women's and girls’ education. She is the former Chair of the Jewish Foundation for Education of Women (JFEW), a 130-year-old institution providing educational scholarships to women in need of all religions and ethnicities. Smith has held the position since 2010 and has served as an active board member of JFEW since 1992.

== Personal ==
Smith is married to Robert C. Smith, former Senior Advisor at Greenhill & Co. They have two daughters, Jessica and Lilly and two grandchildren, Ruby and Margot Friedman. Smith was born Jill Weber in Gloversville, New York, on October 7, 1953, and is the eldest of two daughters born to Everett and Roberta Rubin Weber. She is a graduate of Mount Holyoke College (1975) and holds an MBA in finance from The Wharton School of the University of Pennsylvania (1977). In 1998, Smith pursued a law degree at New York Law School while raising her family and graduated in February 2003 with a concentration in Criminal Defense.

== Philanthropy ==
Smith is passionate about Jewish identity and values. Her philanthropic efforts aim to inspire younger generations, especially among immigrants in the U.S. and Jews in the former Soviet Union. In addition to her responsibilities at JFEW, she served on the board of Moishe House, a pluralistic international organization that provides meaningful Jewish experiences to young adults in their 20s. She is the Board Chair of Hunter College Hillel. Smith also serves on the Prize Committee of the Genesis Prize.

== JFEW ==
In 1992, Smith joined the JFEW as a board member. For over 130 years, the Jewish Foundation for Education of Women has provided scholarship and other support to financially needy women who aspire to achieve their career and other life goals through education. Over the course of its history, and in response to the ever-changing times, the Foundation has taken on new and different roles in the life of its scholarship recipients. In addition to giving scholarships to women of varied backgrounds, ethnic and religious affiliations, as entry into the workforce has become increasingly complex and competitive, JFEW has broadened its support to include not only scholarships but also opportunities for internships, study abroad, networking, and other mentoring-type experiences. Under Smith's leadership, JFEW instituted governance reforms and refocused its grant making on giving scholarship aid and programmatic support to women attending CUNY and SUNY schools. Under Smith's leadership, the JFEW board continues to honor the Foundation's long tradition of supporting immigrants, both within and outside of the Jewish community. Since 1960, the Foundation has given nearly $75 million to 10,000 women.
