= Jillian Roberts =

Canadian child psychologist and author

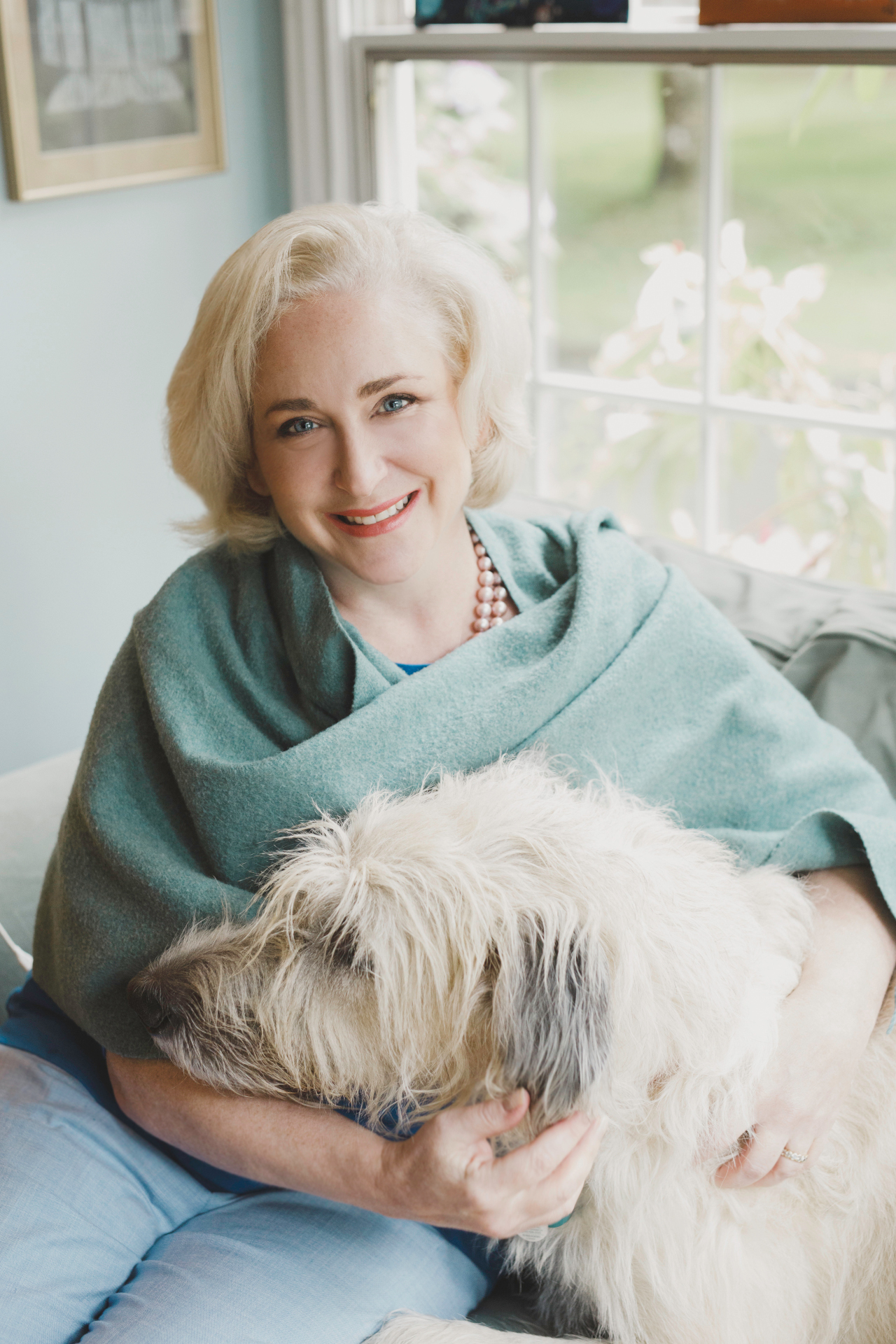
- Occupation: Child psychologist

Academic background
- Education: University of Waterloo; Dalhousie University; University of Calgary; University of Toronto
- Thesis: Canadian families with HIV/AIDS: quality of life experiences in public schools (1998)

Jillian Roberts is a Canadian child psychologist, author, and Professor at the University of Victoria. She splits her time between Vancouver Island and Prince Edward Island.

Born in British Columbia, Roberts obtained degrees from the University of Waterloo (1991), Dalhousie University (1992), the University of Toronto (1995), and the University of Calgary (1998). Her doctoral work was about children with HIV/AIDS. In 1999, she assumed a faculty position in educational psychology at the University of Victoria. Roberts' Just Enough series of children's books was released in 2016. She followed this with the series World Around Us.

Roberts works and writes in both English and French. The first book On Our Streets: Our First Talk About Poverty was co-written with Google's Jaime Casap and a finalist for the 2018 Bolen Books Children's Book Prize, given by the Victoria Book Prize Society. In 2022, Roberts published "Calm" and "My Promise" for the youngest of readers., as well as a book for parents with babies. In 2022, she began writing regular parenting articles for Today's Parent. In 2023, the mental health clinics that were founded under her name were rebranded as MindKey Health. In 2024, she began writing for the Globe and Mail.
