= Jill (disambiguation) =

Jill is a feminine given name.

Jill may also refer to:

- Jill (cat), a cat on Blue Peter
- Jill (novel), a novel by Philip Larkin
- Jill (TV program), a Dutch television program hosted by Jill Schirnhofer
- Nakajima B6N, (Allied reporting name: Jill), a Japanese torpedo bomber of World War II
- Jill or jillstrap, a piece of protective equipment
- A female ferret
- Buffalo Jills, a cheerleading squad
- Jill, one of the Clayton Windmills, at Clayton, Sussex

== See also ==
- Jil (disambiguation)
