= Jill Siegfried =

American pharmacologist

Jill M. Siegfried is an American pharmacologist.

A Milwaukee, Wisconsin, native, Siegfried attended Wellesley College, where she received a double degree in German and molecular biology before earning advanced degrees in pharmacology from Yale University. Siegfried completed two years of postdoctoral study at the University of North Carolina, Chapel Hill prior to joining the faculty of University of Pittsburgh. Later, she was named University of Pittsburgh Medical Center (UPMC) Endowed Chair for Lung Cancer Research, a position she left in 2013 to accept an appointment at the University of Minnesota as Frederick and Alice Stark Professor of Pharmacology.
