= Jill Idh =

Swedish kickboxer

Jill Idh is a Swedish kickboxer who has won several medals in national competitions, most notably gold medals for muaythai and K1 at the World Championships in 2009 and a silver medal at the European Championships for K1 rules.
