= Jillie Mack =

English stage actress (born 1957)

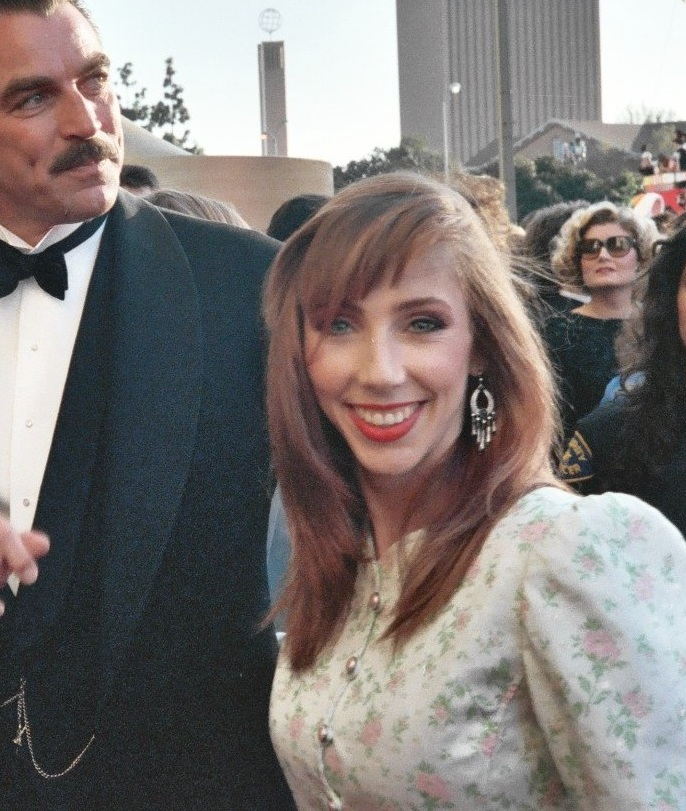
Mack with Tom Selleck in 1989

Jillian Joan "Jillie" Mack (born 25 December 1957) is an English-born former stage actress, who appeared in numerous stage productions in the late 1970s to early 1980s. Since 1987 she has been the wife of actor Tom Selleck.

== Early life and stage career ==
Born and raised in Devizes in Wiltshire, England, the daughter of engineer Peter Mack and his wife Betty, Mack was educated at St Joseph's School in Devizes and later at St Augustine's Catholic School in Trowbridge. She received dance instruction through weekly classes at the Scouts' Hall on Southbroom Road in Devizes. At the age of 16, she moved to East Grinstead to attend ballet school and pursue a stage career, for which she also attended drama school.

She began a career in musical theatre, appearing as Nancy in a 1978 touring production of Sandy Wilson's musical The Boy Friend presented by the Marlowe Theatre Company. Critic Neville Miller, reviewing a performance at the Theatre Royal in Norwich, singled out a "superbly executed" tango performed by Mack and Michael Remick as a comedic highlight of the production. By 1980, at the age of 22, she had appeared in stage productions including a pantomime season at the Adeline Genée Theatre in East Grinstead and Miss Pepper in The Gingerbread Man, later returning to The Boy Friend in a touring production starring Richard Murdoch. She also appeared in a production of Joseph and the Amazing Technicolor Dreamcoat. To cover the cost of additional vocal training while appearing in the chorus of a touring production of My Fair Lady, she worked part-time as a cleaner. In 1980, Mack was selected by director James Hammerstein to take over the role of Ado Annie in a touring production of Oklahoma! after the departure of actress Shan Stevens. Hammerstein had previously seen Mack perform in My Fair Lady, then touring the United Kingdom after a run at the London Palladium. In 1982, she starred in the play, Lord Arthur Savile's Crime, and was praised for her performance in an otherwise poorly received work. The following year, Mack replaced Bonnie Langford in the role of Rumpleteazer in the West End production of the musical, Cats.

== Marriage and later life ==
As early as October 1983, Mack was rumored to be in a relationship with actor Tom Selleck, whom she met in England after he saw her perform in Cats, which he saw several times while in the country to film Lassiter. On August 7, 1987, Mack married Selleck, with whom she had one daughter, Hannah, who was born 16 December 1988.

After leaving the stage, Mack had about a dozen television appearances, mostly in small roles, including three appearances on Selleck's show, Magnum, P.I., in 1984 and 1985. The most substantial of these was an appearance in the 1985 episode "Professor Jonathan Higgins", as Higgins's distant cousin, Sally Ponting, who arrives from England to marry the heir of a local socialite, but turns out to be a punk rocker in need of a drastic makeover before she can be accepted into society. Mack was a featured performer in the Royal Variety Performance held for Queen Elizabeth II on 20 November 1991, at Theatre Royal, Drury Lane, under the direction of David Frost. She performed “Take that look off your face” from Song & Dance, and the event was broadcast 30 November 1991 on ITV. She costarred with James Coburn in an unsold 1991 TV pilot for show called Silverfox, which aired in July of that year, and was in episodes of Encyclopedia Brown in 1990, Frasier in 1996, with a last television appearance on ER in 2002.
