= Jillian Medoff =

American writer of literary fiction

- Education: Barnard College (BA); New York University (MFA)
- Occupation: Writer
- Spouse: Keith Dawson
- Writing career
- Genre: Fiction

Jillian Medoff is an American writer of literary fiction and a strategic communications specialist.

== Books ==
Her first novel, Hunger Point, was published by ReganBooks in 1997, and became the basis for an original Lifetime movie, starring Barbara Hershey and Christina Hendricks, which first aired in 2003. Hunger Point has been translated into a number of foreign languages, including French, Spanish, Hebrew, among others.

Medoff's second novel, Good Girls Gone Bad, was published by HarperCollins in 2002, and translated into a number of foreign languages as well. Her third novel, I Couldn't Love You More, was published in May 2012 by Grand Central Publishing. Her fourth novel, This Could Hurt, was published by HarperCollins in 2018. Medoff's fifth novel, When We Were Bright and Beautiful, also published by HarperCollins, went on sale on August 2, 2022.

== Education and personal life ==
The eldest daughter of a traveling salesman, Jillian moved 17 times by age 17, ultimately settling in Atlanta, Georgia. She has a BA from Barnard College class of 1985 and a Master of Fine Arts from New York University. She has studied under the direction of Mona Simpson, Jonathan Dee, Robert Coover, and Alice Walker. She also attended Master Classes with Toni Morrison, Joyce Carol Oates, and Grace Paley. She is a former fellow at the MacDowell Colony, Blue Mountain Center, VCCA and Fundacion Valparaiso in Spain. She briefly taught at New York University and the University of Georgia.

Medoff and her husband, Keith Dawson, live in Montclair, New Jersey. Together, they have three adult daughters: Sarah, Olivia and Mollie.

== Corporate career ==
Along with writing novels, Jillian also has a career in management consulting and corporate communications. She's worked for a wide range of employers across multiple industries, including Deloitte, Aon, Revlon, Max Factor and Medco. Medoff attributes her success as a novelist to her corporate career, "Having steady, stable employment (i.e., a corporate job) not only offered [Medoff] financial security, it also ensured she’d never be forced to write solely as a means to pay rent." Now, as a Senior Consultant with SegalBenz, a division of The Segal Group, she advises clients on communication strategies.
