= Gillian Stroudley =

English artist

Gillian Stroudley née Thain (1925–1992) was an English painter and printmaker.

== Life and work ==
Gillian Stroudley was born Gillian Thain in Epsom, Surrey in 1925. She studied painting and wood engraving at St. Martin's School of Art between 1945-1951 under the supervision of Gertrude Hermes and Clifford Webb. After graduating, she worked as an art teacher for the Inner London Education Authority and also as a freelance textile designer. An extremely talented printmaker, her etchings were exhibited at the Royal Academy, London and are also found in the collections of the National Library and Museum of Wales.

She married the artist James Stroudley, they had two sons and one daughter.

== Exhibitions ==
Gillian exhibited the etchings The Copse and Angle Church at High Water in the Large South Room of The Royal Academy in 1995, alongside Sir Hugh Casson and Diana Armfield.
