= Jill Becker =

American psychological researcher

Jill B. Becker
- Education: University of Illinois
- Scientific career
- Workplaces: University of Michigan

Jill B. Becker is an American psychological researcher, studying sex differences in addiction using preclinical models. Becker is the Biopsychology Area Chair and the Patricia Y. Gurin Professor of Psychology at University of Michigan. She has advocated for greater research into sex/gender differences, particularly in the area of Substance Use Disorder.

== Education ==
After graduating and receiving a Bachelors of Arts and Doctors of Medicine in human development from the University of Texas, Becker moved on and received her Ph.D. in neuroscience from the University of Illinois.

== Awards and honors ==
2016- She received the Ting-Kai Li Lecture Award from the Research Society on Alcoholism. In 2019, she was invited to deliver the Neal Miller Distinguished Lecture by the American Psychological Association.

2020- Becker was awarded the Health Education Visionary Award from the Society for Woman's Health Research (SWHR), Becker was honored for her award at the health of woman at SWHR's Annual Awards Dinner on October 22, 2020. The awards celebrate women who have advanced woman's health throughout their careers.

2021- Becker was awarded the Bernice Grafstein Award for Outstanding Accomplishments in Mentoring. The award is given in recognition of the leaders who have aided the earl careers of women neuroscientists and eased their retention in the field.

2022- Becker received the Distinguished Faculty Achievement Award by The University of Michigan for having consistently demonstrated outstanding achievements in her areas of research.

== Significant contributors ==
Jill B. Becker and Michele L. McClellan have also collaborated on several papers. Their work followed up studies examining sex differences in addiction and their psychological, sociocultural and biological links. Key publications include:

- "Sociocultural context for sex differences in addiction" published September 21, 2016.
- "Sex Differences, Gender, and Addiction" published January 2, 2019.

Becker also participated in "Sex differences in vulnerability to addiction", with Jacqueline A. Quigley, Molly K. Logsdon, Christopher A. Turner, Ivette L. Gonzalez, and Noah B. Leonardo. The paper was published April 1, 2021 and consisted of studies on how estradiol influences dopamine-related motivated behaviors and their vulnerability on both sex.

== Selected publications ==
- Becker, J. B. (1999). "Gender differences in dopaminergic function in striatum and nucleus accumbens". Pharmacology Biochemistry and Behavior. 64 (4): 803–812. doi:10.1016/S0091-3057(99)00168-9. PMID 10593204. S2CID 12846964.
- Becker, J. B.; Hu, M (2008). "Sex differences in drug abuse". Frontiers in Neuroendocrinology. 29 (1): 36–47. doi:10.1016/j.yfrne.2007.07.003. PMC 2235192. PMID 17904621.
- Becker, J. B.; Koo, G. F. (2016). "Sex differences in animal models: focus on addiction". Pharmacological Reviews. 68 (2): 242–263. doi:10.1124/pr.115.011163. PMC 4813426. PMID 26772794.
