= J. Jill Suitor =

American sociologist

- Born: c. 1954 (age 71–72)
- Occupation: Sociology Professor

Jaclynn Jill Suitor (born c. 1954) is an American Distinguished Professor of Sociology and a member of the Center on Aging and the Life Course at Purdue University. Her research focuses primarily on the relationship between parents and adult children. Since 2000, she has led the Within-Family Differences Study, a panel investigation of the predictors and consequences of parental favoritism in the middle and later years among more than 500 multigenerational families. She is an elected Fellow of the Gerontological Society of America and an elected member of the Sociological Research Association.

== Education ==
B.A. California State University Sociology 1976

Suitor earned a Ph.D. in sociology from the State University of New York at Stony Brook in 1985.

== Major work ==
In 2001, Jill Suitor and Karl Pillemer began The Within Family Differences Study (WFDS), to achieve greater understanding of these processes in aging families. WFDS is a longitudinal project focused on understanding the relationship between parents and their adult children, and the ways in which these ties affect the well-being of both generations. The goals are to contribute to the scientific study of intergenerational relationships and provide a basis for the development of strategies for practitioners to employ when working with later-life families.
