= National Register of Historic Places listings in Tyler County, West Virginia =

Location of Tyler County in West Virginia

This is a list of the National Register of Historic Places listings in Tyler County, West Virginia.

This is intended to be a complete list of the properties and districts on the National Register of Historic Places in Tyler County, West Virginia, United States. The locations of National Register properties and districts for which the latitude and longitude coordinates are included below, may be seen in a Google map.

There are 10 properties and districts listed on the National Register in the county.

This National Park Service list is complete through NPS recent listings posted March 21, 2025.

Contents: Counties in West Virginia

Barbour - Berkeley - Boone - Braxton - Brooke - Cabell - Calhoun - Clay - Doddridge - Fayette - Gilmer - Grant - Greenbrier - Hampshire - Hancock - Hardy - Harrison - Jackson - Jefferson - Kanawha - Lewis - Lincoln - Logan - Marion - Marshall - Mason - McDowell - Mercer - Mineral - Mingo - Monongalia - Monroe - Morgan - Nicholas - Ohio - Pendleton - Pleasants - Pocahontas - Preston - Putnam - Raleigh - Randolph - Ritchie - Roane - Summers - Taylor - Tucker - Tyler - Upshur - Wayne - Webster - Wetzel - Wirt - Wood - Wyoming

== Current listings ==
	Name on the Register	Image	Date listed	Location	City or town	Description
1	E. A. Durham House	E. A. Durham House	June 19, 1973 (#73001924)	110 Chelsea St. 39°33′06″N 81°00′02″W	Sistersville	
2	Friendly City Building and Jail	Friendly City Building and Jail	November 22, 1999 (#99001404)	WV 2, Orchard St. 39°30′55″N 81°03′35″W	Friendly	
3	Middlebourne Historic District	Middlebourne Historic District	July 9, 1993 (#93000613)	Main, East, and Dodd Sts. 39°29′34″N 80°54′38″W	Middlebourne	
4	Sistersville City Hall	Sistersville City Hall	October 5, 1972 (#72001292)	City Sq., Main and Diamond Sts. 39°33′53″N 80°59′47″W	Sistersville	
5	Sistersville Historic District	Sistersville Historic District	August 13, 1975 (#75001899)	From Chelsea to the Ohio River between Catherine and both sides of Virginia Sts. 39°33′55″N 80°59′45″W	Sistersville	
6	Tyler County Courthouse and Jail	Tyler County Courthouse and Jail	June 23, 1980 (#80004044)	Main and Dodd Sts. 39°29′31″N 80°54′14″W	Middlebourne	
7	Wells Inn	Wells Inn	October 5, 1972 (#72001293)	316 Charles St. 39°33′48″N 80°59′55″W	Sistersville	
8	William Wells House	William Wells House	July 21, 1987 (#87001176)	WV 18; 39°26′05″N 80°49′31″W	Tyler	
9	Wells-Schaff House	Wells-Schaff House	January 7, 1986 (#86000054)	500 S. Wells; 39°33′26″N 81°00′19″W	Sistersville	
10	Wells-Twyford House		April 29, 1991 (#91000447)	Junction of WV 2 and Kahle St. 39°32′57″N 81°00′50″W	Sistersville	

== See also ==
- List of National Historic Landmarks in West Virginia
- National Register of Historic Places listings in West Virginia
