= Juliann =

Juliann is a given name. Notable people with the name include:

- Juliann Bluitt Foster (1938–2019), American dentist
- Juliann Graham (1915–1935), American church choir singer and actress

== See also ==
- Julian (given name)
- Juliana
- Julianne
