= Middlebourne Historic District =

Historic district in West Virginia, United States

- U.S. National Register of Historic Places
- U.S. Historic district
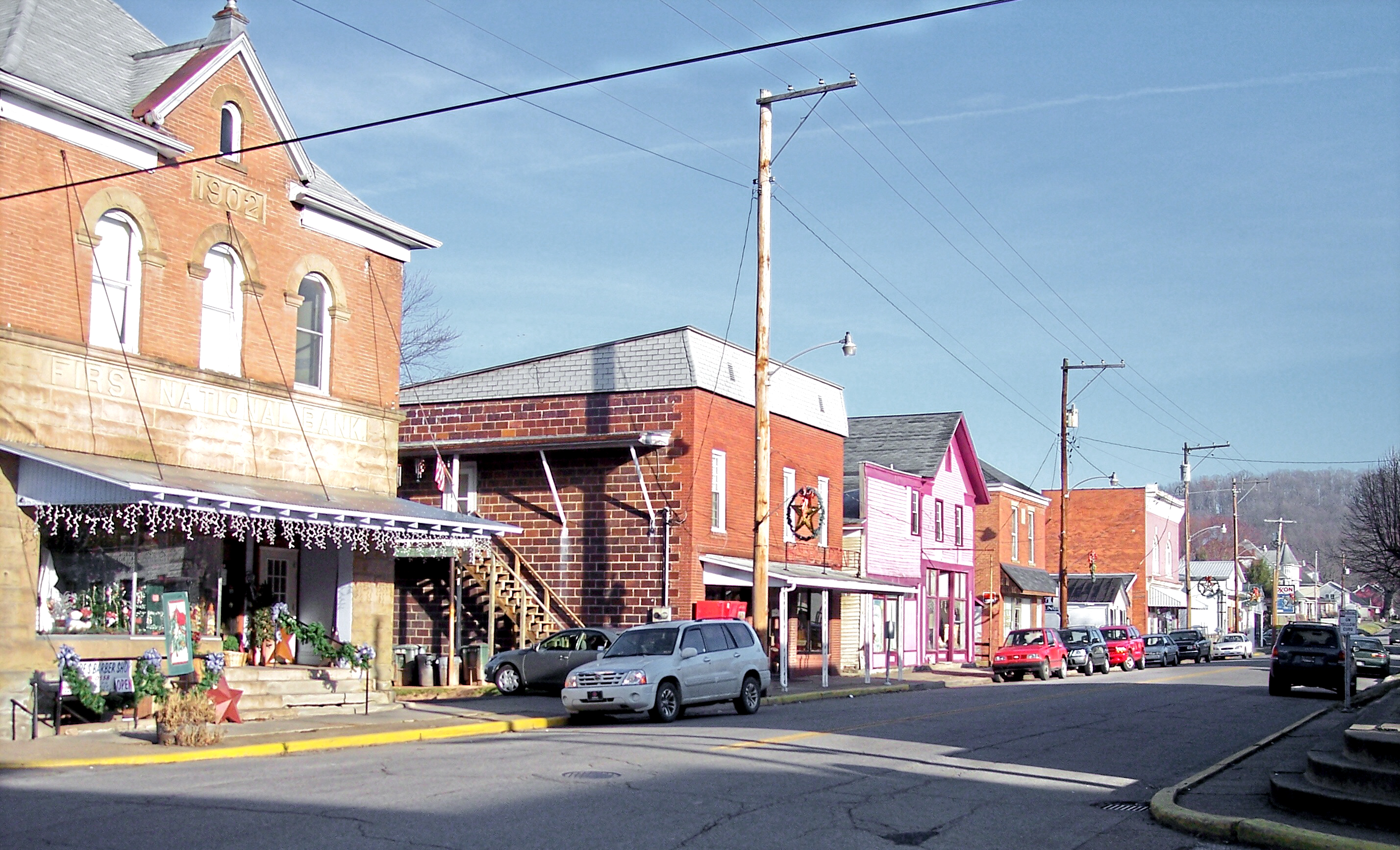
- Middlebourne, West Virginia, December 2006

- Location within West Virginia Location within the United States
- Location: Main, East, and Dodd Sts., Middlebourne, West Virginia
- Coordinates: 39°29′34″N 80°54′38″W
- Area: 50 acres (20 ha)
- Built: 1812
- Architect: Multiple
- Architectural style: Classical Revival, Queen Anne, Federal
- NRHP reference No.: 93000613
- Added to NRHP: July 9, 1993

Middlebourne Historic District is a national historic district located at Middlebourne, Tyler County, West Virginia. It encompasses 88 contributing buildings that include the civic, commercial, and residential core of Middlebourne. Most of the buildings in the district date from the late-19th and early-20th century in popular architectural styles, such as Queen Anne and Classical Revival. The two oldest are the Federal-style Quinif House (1805) and Gorrell-Wetzel House (1807). Other notable buildings include the Tyler County High School (1907), First National Bank (1902), Smith's Drug Store (c. 1890), Nadene Theater (c. 1920), The Powell-Shore House (c. 1898-99; the town's best example of Queen Anne Architecture), the Weekley House (c. 1905), the Huth-Fletcher House (1895), and United Methodist Church and Parsonage (1910). Also located in the district is the separately listed Tyler County Courthouse and Jail (1854, 1874, 1922).

It was listed on the National Register of Historic Places in 1993.
