= Sistersville Historic District =

Historic district in West Virginia, United States

- U.S. National Register of Historic Places
- U.S. Historic district
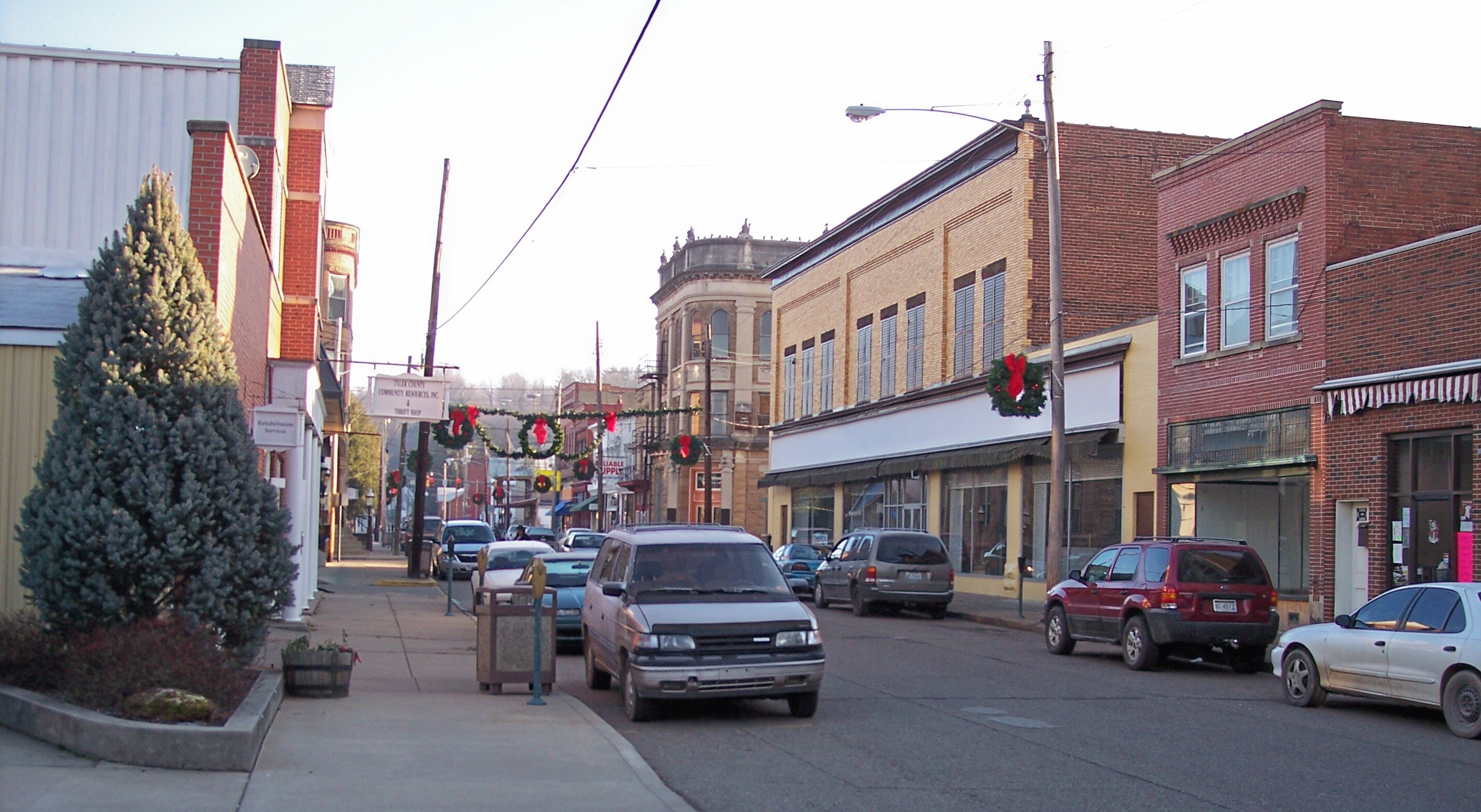
- Sistersville, West Virginia, December 2006

- Location within West Virginia Location within the United States
- Location: From Chelsea to the Ohio River between Catherine and both sides of Virginia Sts., Sistersville, West Virginia
- Coordinates: 39°33′55″N 80°59′45″W
- Area: 45 acres (18 ha)
- Built: 1815
- Architect: O`Neil, William B.
- Architectural style: Colonial Revival, Greek Revival, Late Victorian
- NRHP reference No.: 75001899
- Added to NRHP: August 13, 1975

Sistersville Historic District is a national historic district located at Sistersville, Tyler County, West Virginia. It encompasses 215 contributing buildings and one contributing structure that include the civic, commercial, and residential core of Sistersville. Most of the buildings in the district date from the late-19th and early-20th century in popular architectural styles, such as Greek Revival, Colonial Revival, and Late Victorian. Notable buildings include the Russell Building or Daily Oil Review Office (1832), McCormick /Henderson House (1880-1884), St. Paul's Episcopal Church (1885), Main Street School (1896), Union National Bank Building, Henneghan-Daly Block (1896), and Riverside Mill (1852). Also located in the district are the separately listed Sistersville City Hall (1897) and Wells Inn (1894).

It was listed on the National Register of Historic Places in 1975.
