= Friendly, West Virginia =

- Town
- Location of Friendly in Tyler County, West Virginia.
- Coordinates: 39°30′54″N 81°3′40″W
- Country: United States
- State: West Virginia
- County: Tyler

Area
  - Total: 0.10 sq mi (0.26 km^{2})
  - Land: 0.10 sq mi (0.26 km^{2})
  - Water: 0 sq mi (0.00 km^{2})
- Elevation: 627 ft (191 m)

Population (2020)
  - Total: 101
  - Estimate (2021): 98
  - Density: 1,198.5/sq mi (462.73/km^{2})
- Time zone: UTC-5 (Eastern (EST))
  - Summer (DST): UTC-4 (EDT)
- ZIP code: 26146
- Area code: 304
- FIPS code: 54-29404
- GNIS feature ID: 1554513

Friendly is a town in Tyler County, West Virginia, United States. The population was 100 at the 2020 census.

== History ==
The town was likely named for Friend Cochrane Williamson, an early settler. Friendly was incorporated in 1898.

It is the setting of the novel Shiloh.

The 1884 heirloom tomato variety was said to be discovered by James Lyde Williamson growing in a pile of flood debris along the Ohio River near Friendly, after the Great Flood of 1884.

In 1903 the Parkersburg and Ohio Valley Electric Railway began to build a major electric interurban railway between Wheeling and Parkersburg. It only opened five miles (8 km) between Sistersville and Friendly, and it operated until 1918. Friendly was claimed to have been one of the smallest settlements in the US with a dedicated interurban service, since it only had 217 residents at the time.

The Friendly City Building and Jail has been listed on the National Register of Historic Places.

== Geography ==
Friendly is located at 39°30′54″N 81°3′40″W (39.514888, -81.061011), along the Ohio River; directly across from Matamoras, Ohio.

According to the United States Census Bureau, the town has a total area of 0.09 square miles (0.23 km^{2}), all land.

== Demographics ==
Historical population
Census	Pop.	Note	%±
1900	253		—
1910	217		−14.2%
1920	173		−20.3%
1930	170		−1.7%
1940	148		−12.9%
1950	216		45.9%
1960	195		−9.7%
1970	190		−2.6%
1980	242		27.4%
1990	146		−39.7%
2000	159		8.9%
2010	132		−17.0%
2020	101		−23.5%
2021 (est.)	98	▼	−3.0%
U.S. Decennial Census

=== 2010 census ===
As of the census of 2010, there were 132 people, 55 households, and 37 families living in the town. The population density was 1,466.7 inhabitants per square mile (566.3/km^{2}). There were 73 housing units at an average density of 811.1 per square mile (313.2/km^{2}). The racial makeup of the town was 100.0% White.

There were 55 households, of which 27.3% had children under the age of 18 living with them, 45.5% were married couples living together, 10.9% had a female householder with no husband present, 10.9% had a male householder with no wife present, and 32.7% were non-families. 21.8% of all households were made up of individuals, and 3.6% had someone living alone who was 65 years of age or older. The average household size was 2.40 and the average family size was 2.68.

The median age in the town was 47 years. 20.5% of residents were under the age of 18; 7.5% were between the ages of 18 and 24; 17.4% were from 25 to 44; 32.6% were from 45 to 64; and 22% were 65 years of age or older. The gender makeup of the town was 51.5% male and 48.5% female.

=== 2000 census ===
As of the census of 2000, there were 159 people, 62 households, and 47 families living in the town. The population density was 1,664.3 inhabitants per square mile (613.9/km^{2}). There were 70 housing units at an average density of 732.7 per square mile (270.3/km^{2}). The racial makeup of the town was 99.99% White.

There were 62 households, out of which 30.6% had children under the age of 18 living with them, 64.5% were married couples living together, 11.3% had a female householder with no husband present, and 22.6% were non-families. 19.4% of all households were made up of individuals, and 9.7% had someone living alone who was 65 years of age or older. The average household size was 2.56 and the average family size was 2.83.

In the town, the population was spread out, with 22.0% under the age of 18, 5.0% from 18 to 24, 33.3% from 25 to 44, 25.8% from 45 to 64, and 13.8% who were 65 years of age or older. The median age was 36 years. For every 100 females, there were 91.6 males. For every 100 females age 18 and over, there were 90.8 males.

The median income for a household in the town was $33,571, and the median income for a family was $34,821. Males had a median income of $37,500 versus $15,000 for females. The per capita income for the town was $15,386. About 13.2% of families and 15.0% of the population were below the poverty line, including 12.5% of those under the age of eighteen and 26.7% of those 65 or over.

== See also ==
- List of cities and towns along the Ohio River
