= Friendly City Building and Jail =

- U.S. National Register of Historic Places
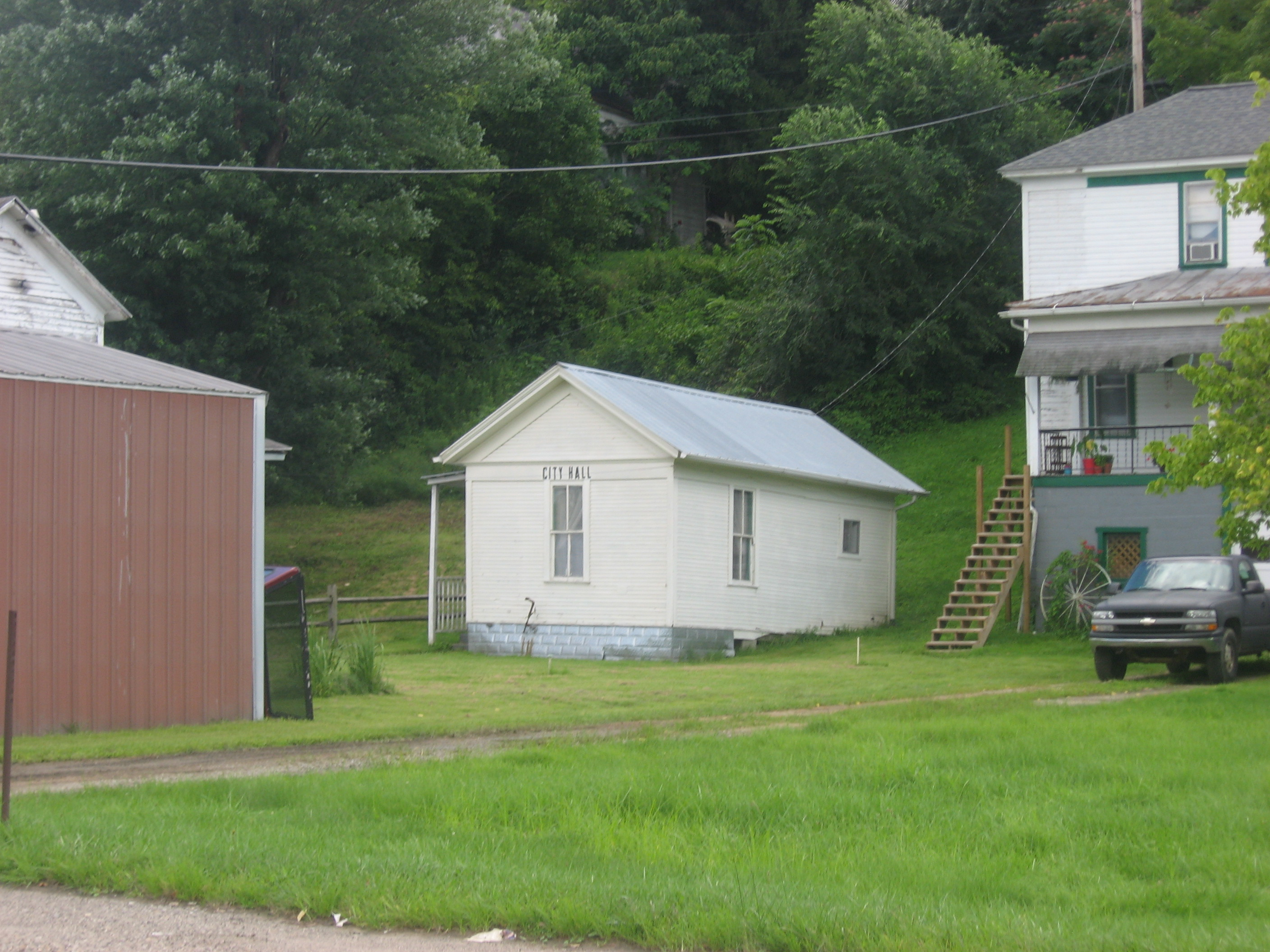
- View from WV 2

- Location within West Virginia Location within the United States
- Location: WV 2, Orchard St., Friendly, West Virginia
- Coordinates: 39°30′53″N 81°3′37″W
- Area: less than one acre
- Built: 1901
- NRHP reference No.: 99001404
- Added to NRHP: November 22, 1999

Friendly City Building and Jail is a historic town hall and jail located at Friendly, Tyler County, West Virginia. It was built in 1901, and is a small, one story frame building. It has a gable roof and sits on a stone foundation. It has two rooms, the meeting room and jail cell. It continues to be used by the town as a meeting place for monthly town board meetings.

It was listed on the National Register of Historic Places in 1999.
