= Wells-Twyford House =

Historic house in West Virginia, United States

- U.S. National Register of Historic Places
- Location within West Virginia Location within the United States
- Location: Junction of WV 2 and Kahle St., near Sistersville, West Virginia
- Coordinates: 39°32′57″N 81°0′50″W
- Area: 0.8 acres (0.32 ha)
- Built: 1854
- Architectural style: Greek Revival, I-house
- NRHP reference No.: 91000447
- Added to NRHP: April 29, 1991

Wells-Twyford House is a historic home located near Sistersville, Tyler County, West Virginia. It was built in 1854, and is a two-story, five-bay, I house plan dwelling with a rear ell and Greek Revival-style details. It has a gable roof and features a one-story, 26 foot long front porch. Also on the property is a two-story frame garage that may have been used as a barn at the beginning of the 20th century.

It was listed on the National Register of Historic Places in 1991.
