= Wells-Schaff House =

Historic house in West Virginia, United States

- U.S. National Register of Historic Places
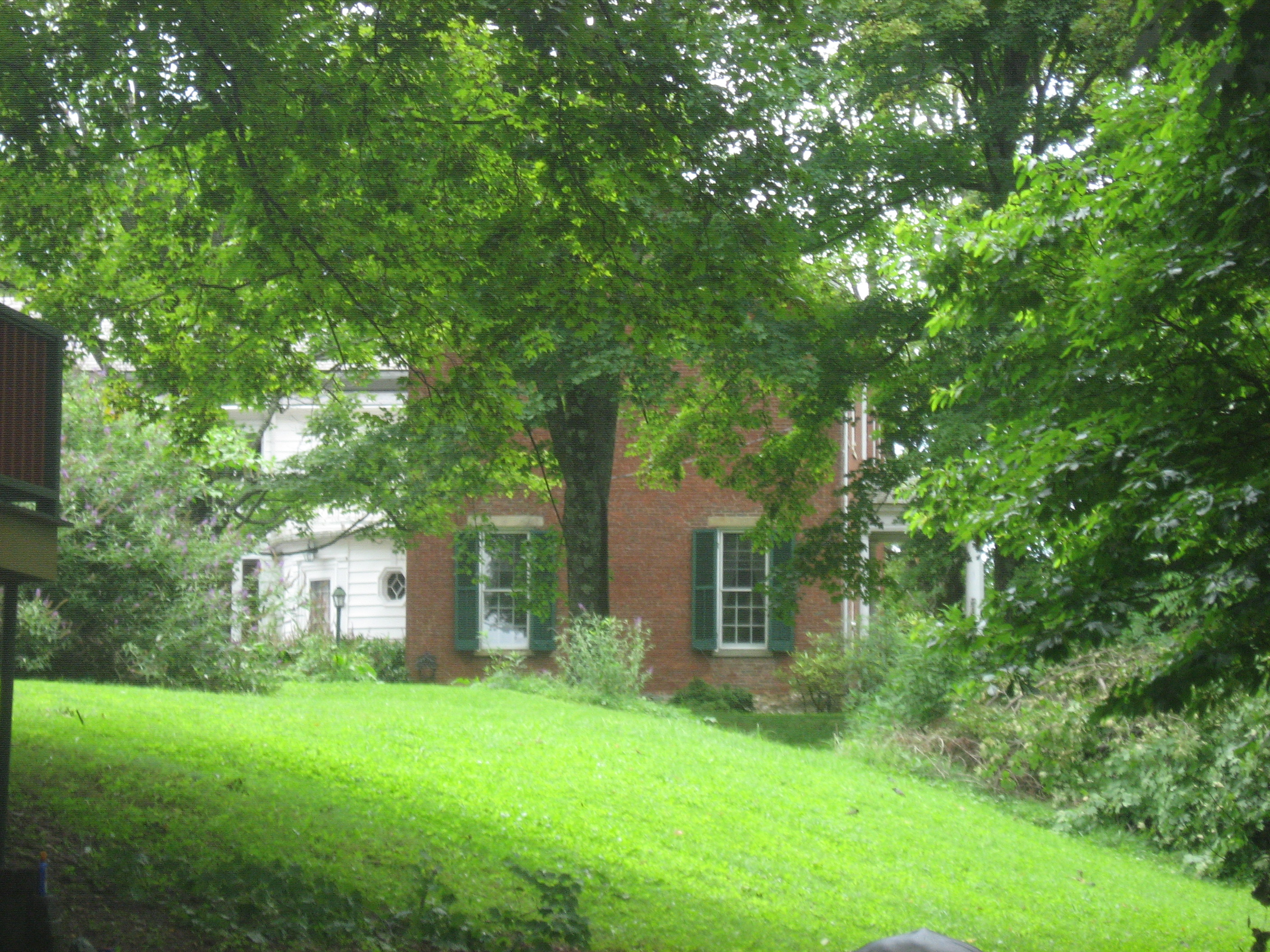
- Seen from Wells Street to the east

- Location within West Virginia Location within the United States
- Location: 500 S. Wells, Sistersville, West Virginia
- Coordinates: 39°33′25″N 81°0′19″W
- Area: 5 acres (2.0 ha)
- Built: 1832
- Architect: Eli Wells
- Architectural style: Federal
- NRHP reference No.: 86000054
- Added to NRHP: January 7, 1986

Wells-Schaff House, also known as "Welkin," is a historic home located at Sistersville, Tyler County, West Virginia. It was built in 1832, and is a two-story, Federal-style brick residence. It features a one-story front porch with Doric order columns added about 1896. The rear addition was built about 1935. Also on the property is a summer house (c. 1935) and the Wells Family cemetery containing the grave of Charles Wells (1745-1815), founder of Wells' Landing.

It was listed on the National Register of Historic Places in 1986.
