= Juliann Graham =

American actress (1915–1935)

Juliann Graham (February 15, 1915 – July 15, 1935) was a church choir singer from Sistersville, West Virginia, USA, who became an actress in Hollywood. She worked in the city library in Sistersville before moving west to make motion pictures.

Her only screen credit is in the role of a waitress in Love In Bloom (1935). The film was directed by Elliott Nugent and starred George Burns and Gracie Allen. She also acted as an extra in Rose of the Rancho.

Graham shot and killed herself in the home of the screen cameraman Ben F. Reynolds, 2879 Sunset Place, Los Angeles, California, in 1935. She had spent the weekend at Santa Catalina Island and felt too ill to return to her own residence at the Studio Club. Graham begged Reynolds to let her stay until she felt better. He covered her up in a blanket on a davenport and went to bed.

Reynolds was awakened on the morning of July 15 by a gun report. He found Graham on the floor under a dressing table, dying from a bullet wound through the temple. She had been seated in front of a mirror and put a gun to her temple. Reynolds called police. Graham died a short time after at Georgia Street Receiving Hospital. Reynolds was not held by police. His wife was on a vacation trip in the east.

The Los Angeles coroner decided there would be no inquest. Police said that Graham had attempted suicide twice before. She first swallowed poison on March 8, 1934, shortly after arriving from West Virginia. She again swallowed poison the following September.
