= Sistersville, West Virginia =

City in West Virginia, US

- City
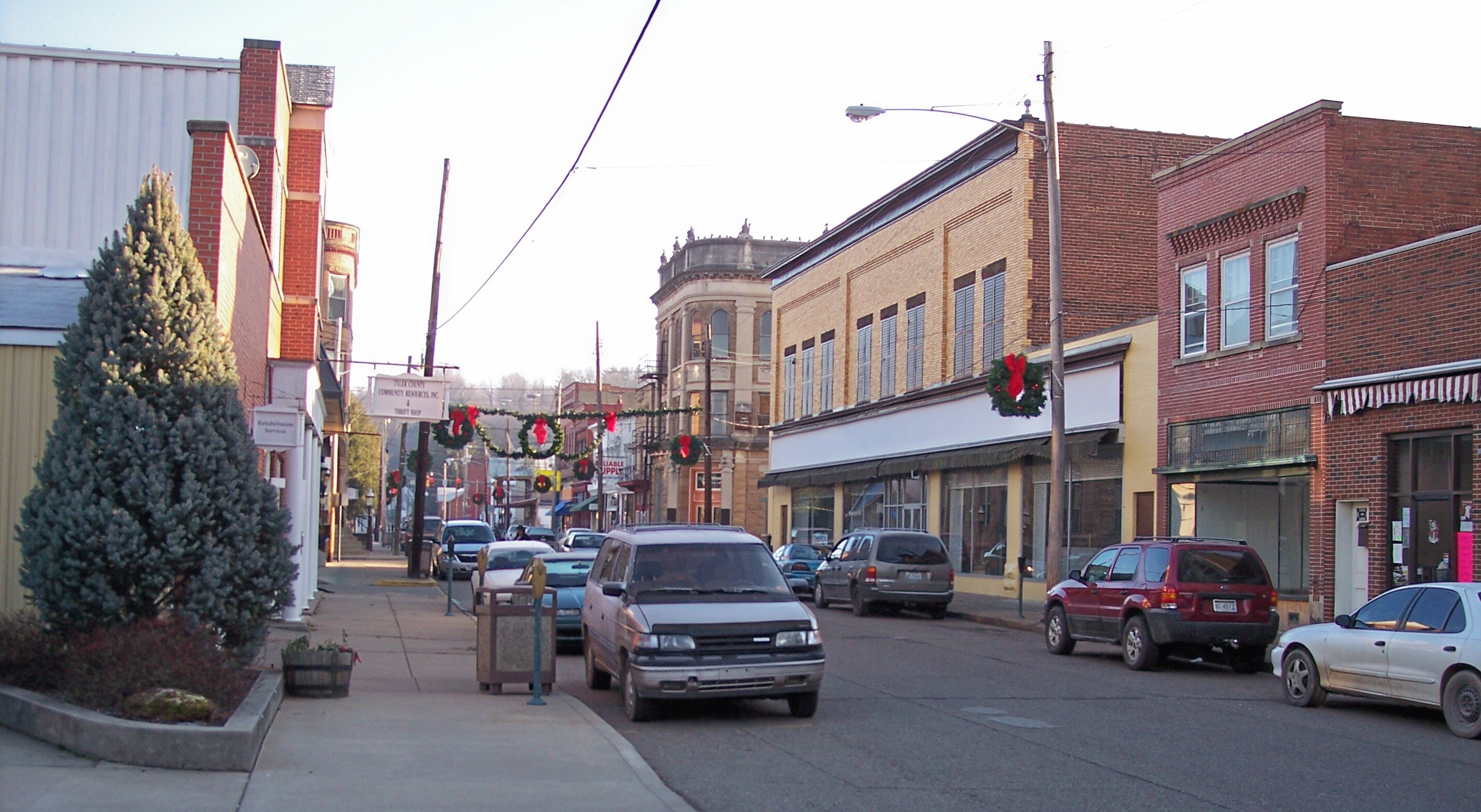
- Wells Street in downtown Sistersville in 2006

- Flag

- Location of Sistersville in Tyler County, West Virginia.
- Coordinates: 39°33′42″N 80°59′52″W
- Country: United States
- State: West Virginia
- County: Tyler
- Established: 1815
- Incorporated: 1839

Area
  - Total: 0.53 sq mi (1.36 km^{2})
  - Land: 0.53 sq mi (1.36 km^{2})
  - Water: 0 sq mi (0.00 km^{2})
- Elevation: 646 ft (197 m)

Population (2020)
  - Total: 1,412
  - Estimate (2021): 1,381
  - Density: 2,440.3/sq mi (942.21/km^{2})
- Time zone: UTC-5 (Eastern (EST))
  - Summer (DST): UTC-4 (EDT)
- ZIP code: 26175
- Area code: 304
- FIPS code: 54-74380
- GNIS feature ID: 1552903
- Website: www.cityofsistersville.com

Sistersville is a city in Tyler County, West Virginia, United States, along the Ohio River. The population was 1,413 at the 2020 census. The Sistersville Ferry crosses the Ohio River to the unincorporated community of Fly in Monroe County, Ohio.

== History ==
Sistersville was named because two sisters, Sarah Wells McCoy and Delilah Wells Grier, inherited the land underlying the town from their father, pioneer Charles Wells, in 1815 and laid out the town. Wells had settled on the sandy bottomland with his second wife, Elizabeth Prather and many of his 22 children (Sarah and Delilah were the 12th and 17th; his first wife Michal Owings had died in 1783 after giving birth to 10 children). The site was called Wells Landing, Wells having previously founded Wellsville and Wellsburg along the Ohio River and having served in the Virginia legislature from Brooke County in 1793. The Virginia General Assembly created Tyler County in 1814, weeks before Wells' death, and a court session was held at Wells' house in Sistersville ("Welkin") in 1815 (the plat having included lots for a courthouse and lawyers' offices), but in 1816 voters selected Middlebourne, on Middle Island Creek about halfway between Pennsylvania and the Kanawha salt springs (and which incorporated in 1813) as the county seat. The Virginia General Assembly chartered Sistersville in 1839. By 1850, Sistersville had grain and wool carding mills. The ferry across the Ohio River which James Jolly had started decades earlier would continue operating into the 21st century. The Russell Building (built in 1840 as a ferry house) would survive many floods and later serve as a market and the offices of the Oil Review edited by J. Hanford McCoy.

Following the Virginia Secession Convention of 1861, Sistersville and Tyler County were divided, but leaned toward the Union (as did their militia group, the "Sistersville Blues"). Nonetheless, Confederate sympathizers seized militia equipment at Sistersville, including dozens of rifles and two small cannons, and the Ohio militiamen sent to protect Parkersburg took more than a month to recover them. Judge Abraham Soper, a New York lawyer and New Jersey judge who had moved to Sistersville in 1847, became Tyler County's representative to the Wheeling Convention and the West Virginia Constitutional Convention of 1862–1863. Fellow delegates elected him their president for the reconvened session of February 1863 (because Congress required the new state's constitution to contain an antislavery provision, which President Abraham Lincoln approved in December 1862). On March 26, voters overwhelmingly ratified the new Constitution (28,321 to 572), so President Lincoln soon acknowledged the revision as adequate thus creating the state of West Virginia. When West Virginia's first legislature divided Tyler County into districts in 1863, Sistersville was in the Lincoln District.

For years, many believed that oil and natural gas lay under Sistersville, because natural gas and salt water had been bubbling up in Burning Springs since before 1836 (in what became Wirt County and development there became an oil boom beginning in 1860). However, the drill Philo Stocking used in 1865 became stuck before it reached oil, but he made sure to retain oil and gas rights to land he sold, which later made him rich. The large Sistersville Oil Field was only confirmed in 1891, with the "Joshua Russell Pole Cat No. 1", successfully drilled by Russell and Edward Paden near Pole Cat creek after they drained salt water for a year. The find proved one of the more productive wells in the field, still producing oil (some refined as gasoline) in 1925. The find occurred as the oil fields in Oil City, Pennsylvania (developed beginning 1861) were running dry and technology had progressed to drain the initial water cap above the oil. Within a few years, Sistersville had ballooned into a city of 15,000 people. In 1893, Sistersville (briefly) was the "oil capital of the world". Unlike some of the Pennsylvania boom towns which became ghost towns, Sistersville invested in infrastructure, and the railroad had arrived in 1884. A spur connected Sistersville to the county seat at Middlebourne.

A disastrous flood of the Ohio River in 1913 (which crested at 51.5 feet at Wheeling upriver and 69.9 feet downriver at Cincinnati) caused considerable damage in Sistersville. The town has also experienced several major fires, long before a 1970 fire that destroyed a historic downtown block, Sistersville had several fire brigades or pumping companies. A gasoline plant was built at the oil field and in 1911 the Carter Oil company built the world's largest gasoline refinery south of Sistersville, which had an explosion in 1913 but was rebuilt, such that the American Petroleum Institute cited Sistersville for its exemplary gas development work in 1925. Sistersville's Tyler High School graduate Cecil H. Underwood (1922–2008) at age 22 represented the county in the House of Delegates, and became the youngest-ever West Virginia governor in 1956, then in 1996 was elected again and became the state's oldest governor.

=== Historical sites ===
The Sistersville City Hall is a historic city hall building listed on the National Register of Historic Places. The City Hall is contributing property of the Sistersville Historic District.

Other listed historic properties in Sistersville include the Wells-Schaff House (a/k/a "Welkin" was built beginning in 1832 by Eli Wells, son of Charles Wells, who wanted a residence outside the flood plain, and expanded in 1896 and renovated circa 1935), the Wells Inn (opened 1895, built by Eli Wells's son Ephraim who fostered local business development), the E. A. Durham House (built circa 1921 for oil executive E.A. Durham), and the Wells-Twyford House (built beginning 1854 by Eli Wells and owned by his heirs until acquired by the Twyford family, descended from Elizabeth Wells Archer, a different family than the Charles Wells descendants).

== Geography ==
Sistersville is located at 39°33′42″N 80°59′52″W (39.561615, -80.997791).

According to the United States Census Bureau, the city has a total area of 0.53 square miles (1.37 km^{2}), all land.

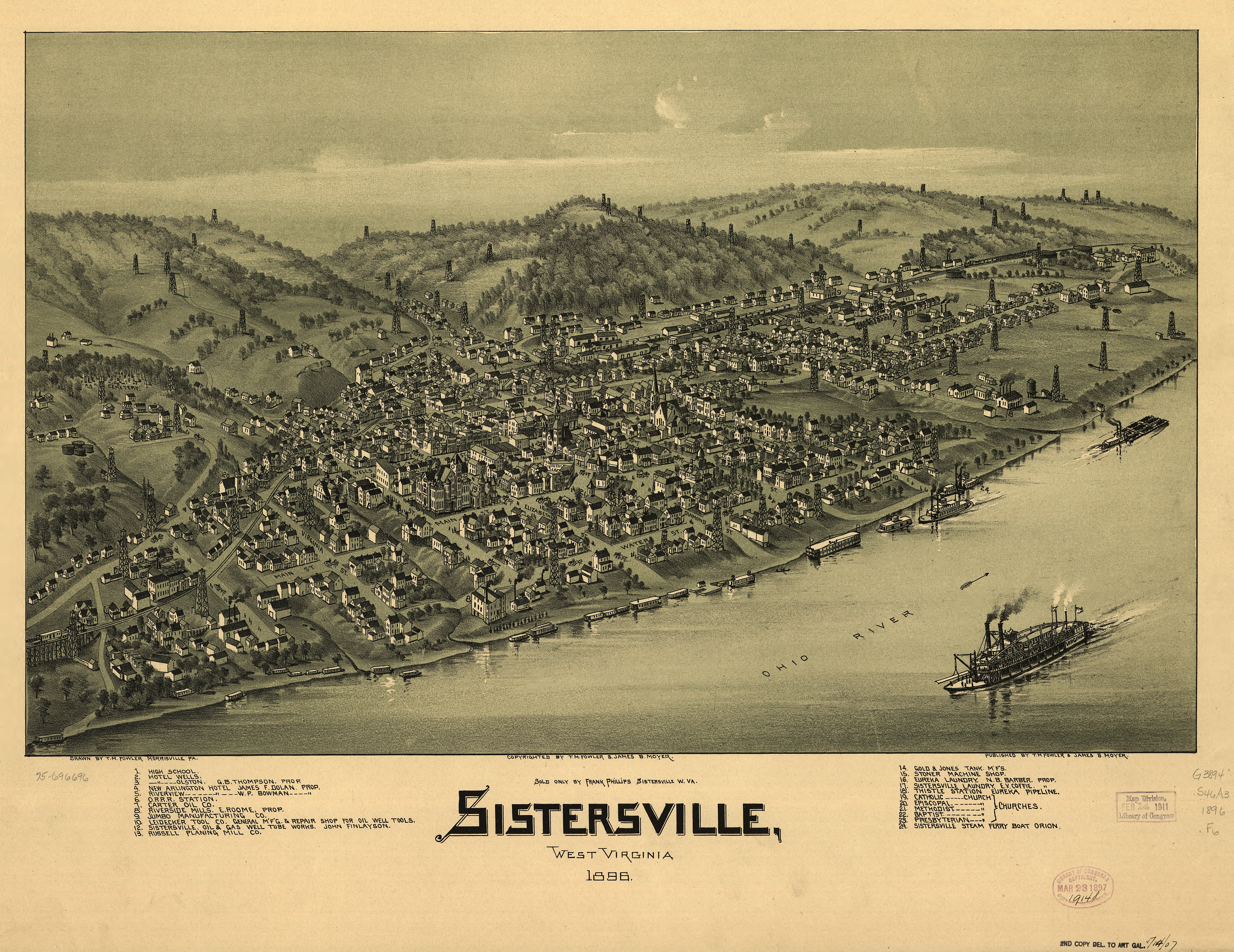
Map of Sistersville 1896

== Demographics ==
Historical population
Census	Pop.	Note	%±
1860	351		—
1870	304		−13.4%
1880	386		27.0%
1890	469		21.5%
1900	2,979		535.2%
1910	2,684		−9.9%
1920	3,238		20.6%
1930	3,072		−5.1%
1940	2,702		−12.0%
1950	2,313		−14.4%
1960	2,331		0.8%
1970	2,246		−3.6%
1980	2,367		5.4%
1990	1,797		−24.1%
2000	1,588		−11.6%
2010	1,396		−12.1%
2020	1,412		1.1%
2021 (est.)	1,381		−2.2%
U.S. Decennial Census

=== 2020 census ===
As of the 2020 census, Sistersville had a population of 1,412. The median age was 41.1 years. 22.0% of residents were under the age of 18 and 20.2% of residents were 65 years of age or older. For every 100 females there were 87.0 males, and for every 100 females age 18 and over there were 84.3 males age 18 and over.

0.0% of residents lived in urban areas, while 100.0% lived in rural areas.

There were 599 households in Sistersville, of which 29.5% had children under the age of 18 living in them. Of all households, 39.1% were married-couple households, 17.7% were households with a male householder and no spouse or partner present, and 34.4% were households with a female householder and no spouse or partner present. About 31.7% of all households were made up of individuals and 18.7% had someone living alone who was 65 years of age or older.

There were 725 housing units, of which 17.4% were vacant. The homeowner vacancy rate was 0.2% and the rental vacancy rate was 13.7%.

Racial composition as of the 2020 census
Race	Number	Percent
White	1,337	94.7%
Black or African American	1	0.1%
American Indian and Alaska Native	1	0.1%
Asian	2	0.1%
Native Hawaiian and Other Pacific Islander	0	0.0%
Some other race	2	0.1%
Two or more races	69	4.9%
Hispanic or Latino (of any race)	16	1.1%

=== 2010 census ===
As of the census of 2010, there were 1,396 people, 593 households, and 355 families living in the city. The population density was 2,634.0 inhabitants per square mile (1,017.0/km^{2}). There were 726 housing units at an average density of 1,369.8 units per square mile (528.9 units/km^{2}). The racial makeup of the city was 98.9% White, 0.3% African American, 0.2% Native American, 0.1% Asian, 0.1% from other races, and 0.4% from two or more races. Hispanic or Latino of any race were 0.6% of the population.

There were 593 households, of which 27.8% had children under the age of 18 living with them, 44.2% were married couples living together, 11.8% had a female householder with no husband present, 3.9% had a male householder with no wife present, and 40.1% were non-families. 35.9% of all households were made up of individuals, and 18.4% had someone living alone who was 65 years of age or older. The average household size was 2.25 and the average family size was 2.88.

The median age in the city was 44.5 years. 21.8% of residents were under the age of 18; 7.4% were between the ages of 18 and 24; 21.7% were from 25 to 44; 27.9% were from 45 to 64; and 21.2% were 65 years of age or older. The gender makeup of the city was 46.2% male and 53.8% female.

=== 2000 census ===
As of the census of 2000, there were 1,588 people, 694 households, and 460 families living in the city. The population density was 3,028.3 people per square mile (1,169.2 people/km^{2}). There were 779 housing units at an average density of 1,485.5 units per square mile (573.6 units/km^{2}). The racial makeup of the city was 99.50% White, 0.06% African American, 0.06% Asian, and 0.38% from two or more races. Hispanic or Latino of any race were 0.31% of the population.

There were 694 households, out of which 29.8% had children under the age of 18 living with them, 51.0% were married couples living together, 11.8% had a female householder with no husband present, and 33.6% were non-families. 31.6% of all households were made up of individuals, and 18.3% had someone living alone who was 65 years of age or older. The average household size was 2.29 and the average family size was 2.85.

In the city, the population was spread out, with 24.2% under the age of 18, 7.3% from 18 to 24, 25.6% from 25 to 44, 23.6% from 45 to 64, and 19.3% who were 65 years of age or older. The median age was 41 years. For every 100 females, there were 87.9 males. For every 100 females age 18 and over, there were 81.9 males.

The median income for a household in the city was $26,799, and the median income for a family was $33,750. Males had a median income of $34,250 versus $23,875 for females. The per capita income for the city was $15,267. About 16.2% of families and 22.4% of the population were below the poverty line, including 35.8% of those under age 18 and 9.5% of those age 65 or over.

== Notable people ==
- Bill Bolling (1957–) former Lieutenant Governor of Virginia
- Juliann Graham (1915–1935) actress
- Peggy Shanor (1895–1935), silent film actress
- Tara Wilson, Miss West Virginia USA 2000

== See also ==
- List of cities and towns along the Ohio River
