= E. A. Durham House =

Historic house in West Virginia, United States

- U.S. National Register of Historic Places
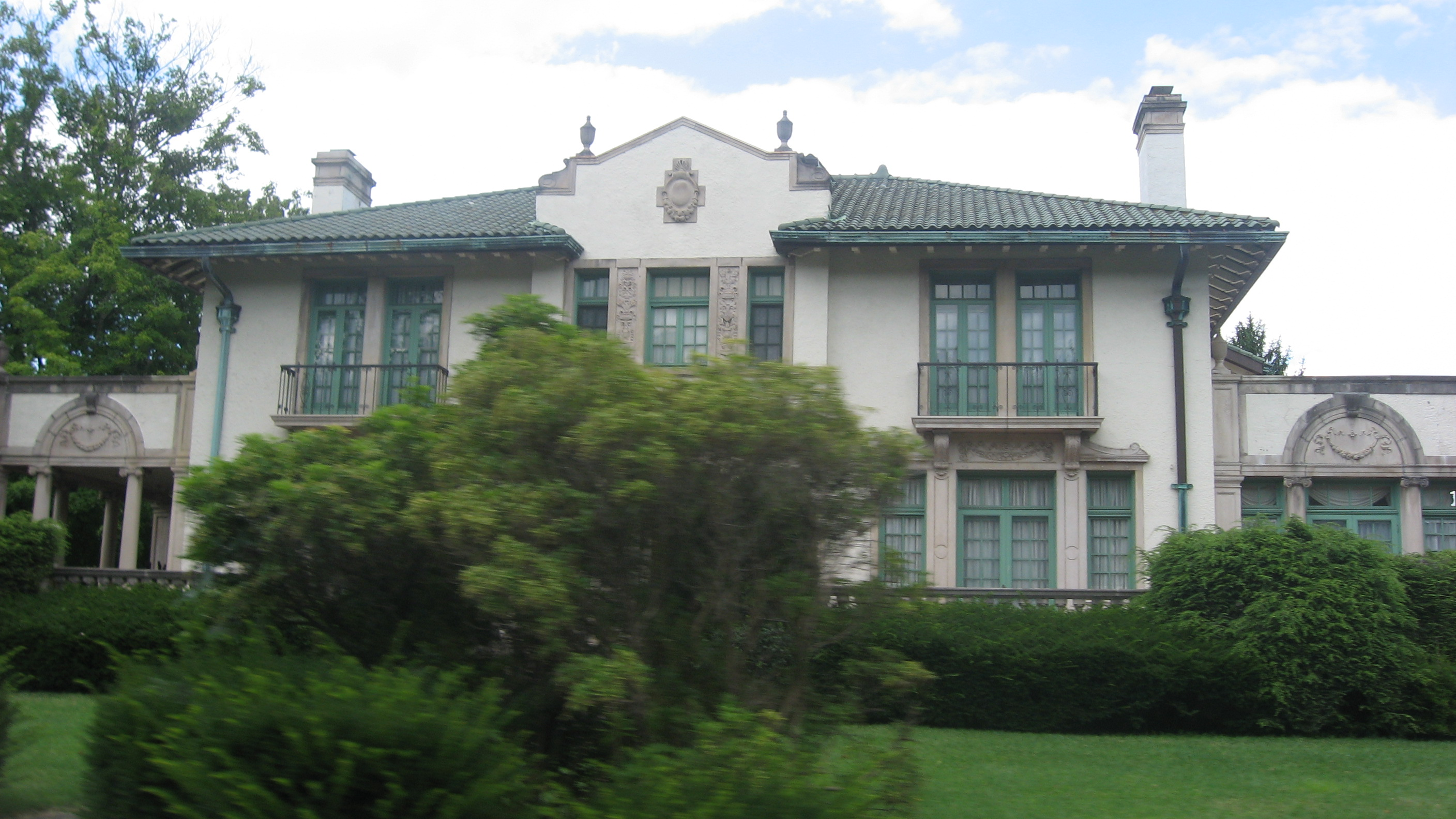
- Front of the house

- Location within West Virginia Location within the United States
- Location: 110 Chelsea St., Sistersville, West Virginia
- Coordinates: 39°33′6″N 81°0′2″W
- Area: less than one acre
- Built: 1921
- Architect: Franzheim, Edward B.
- Architectural style: Renaissance, Italian Renaissance Revival
- NRHP reference No.: 73001924
- Added to NRHP: June 19, 1973

The E. A. Durham House, also known as the Durham-Peters Residence, is a historic home located at Sistersville, Tyler County, West Virginia. It was built in 1921, and is a 20-room Italian Renaissance Revival-style residence. It features pale stone and stucco and a low-pitched green tile roof. The interior features mahogany paneling, a six-foot Carrara marble fireplace, and Dresden chandelier.

It was listed on the National Register of Historic Places in 1973.
