= Tyler County Courthouse and Jail =

- U.S. National Register of Historic Places
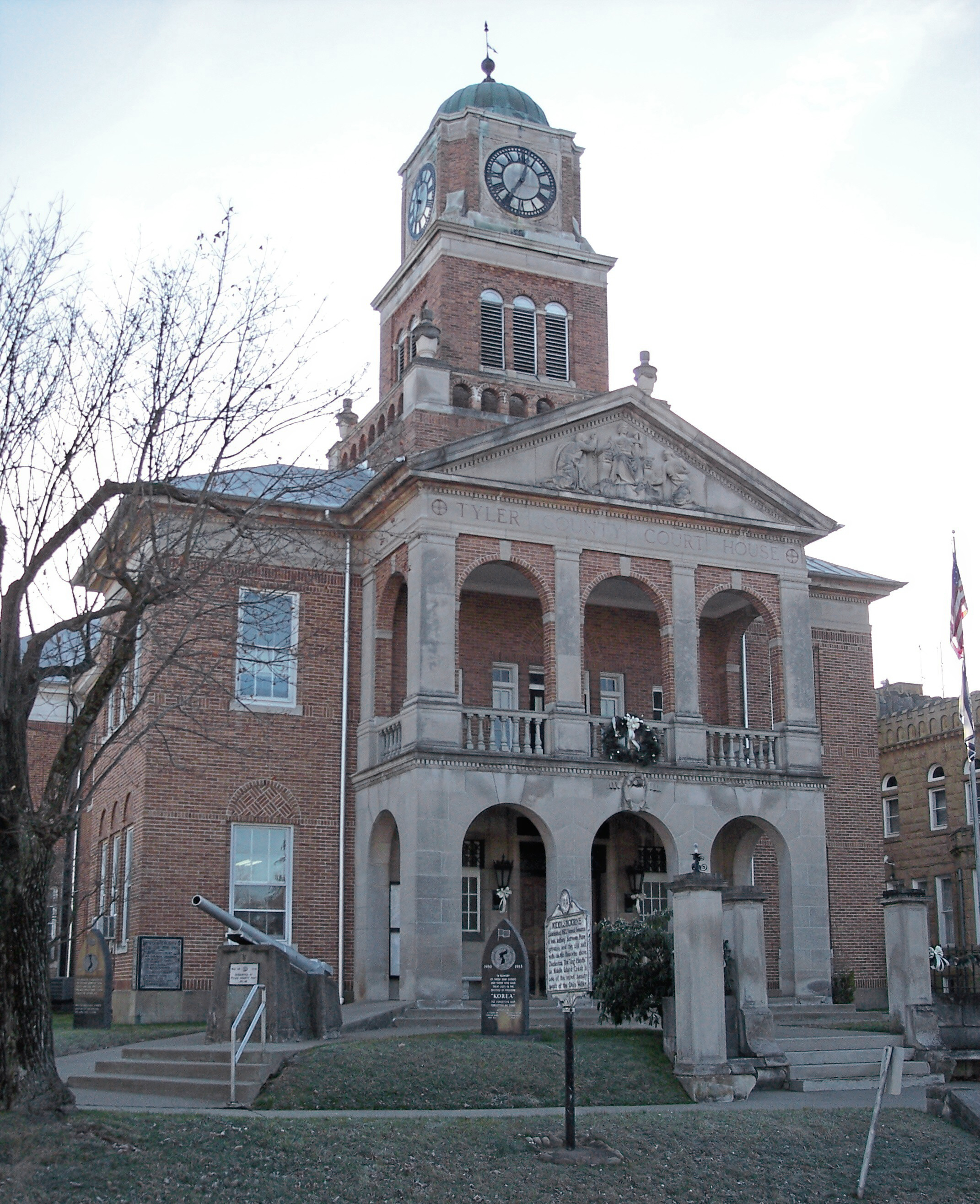

- Location within West Virginia Location within the United States
- Interactive map showing the location of Tyler County Courthouse and Jail
- Location: Main and Dodd Sts., Middlebourne, West Virginia
- Coordinates: 39°29′31″N 80°54′14″W
- Built: 1854
- Architect: Holmboe, E.C.S.; Pogue, Mr.
- Architectural style: Classical Revival, Beaux Arts
- NRHP reference No.: 80004044
- Added to NRHP: June 23, 1980

The Tyler County Courthouse and Jail in Middlebourne, West Virginia, was built in 1854 to replace an 1829 structure. The courthouse was extensively renovated and modified in 1922 to a design by E.C.S. Holmboe and a Mr. Pogue of Clarksburg. The redesign created a Classical Revival composition using the structure of the older building.
