= Sistersville City Hall =

- U.S. National Register of Historic Places
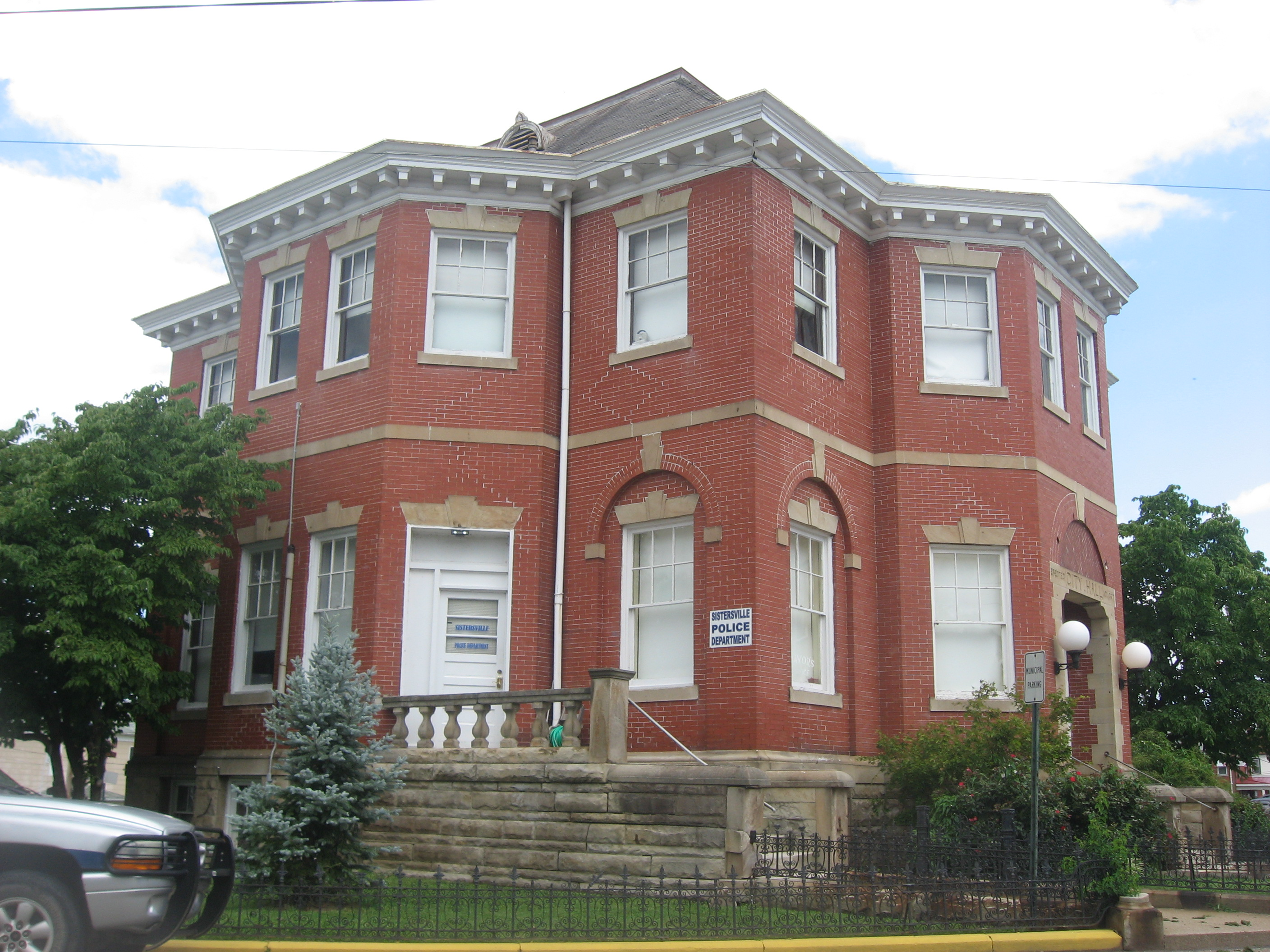
- View from the south

- Location within West Virginia Location within the United States
- Location: City Sq., Main and Diamond Sts., Sistersville, West Virginia
- Coordinates: 39°33′53″N 80°59′49″W
- Area: 0.5 acres (0.20 ha)
- Built: 1897
- NRHP reference No.: 72001292
- Added to NRHP: October 5, 1972

Sistersville City Hall, also known as the City Building, is a historic city hall located at Sistersville, Tyler County, West Virginia. It was built in 1897, and is a two-story red brick and stone building. The 16 sided unique building features centrally located, three-sided bay windows on each section. The building at one time housed the city jail.

It was listed on the National Register of Historic Places in 1972.
