= Wells Inn =

- U.S. National Register of Historic Places
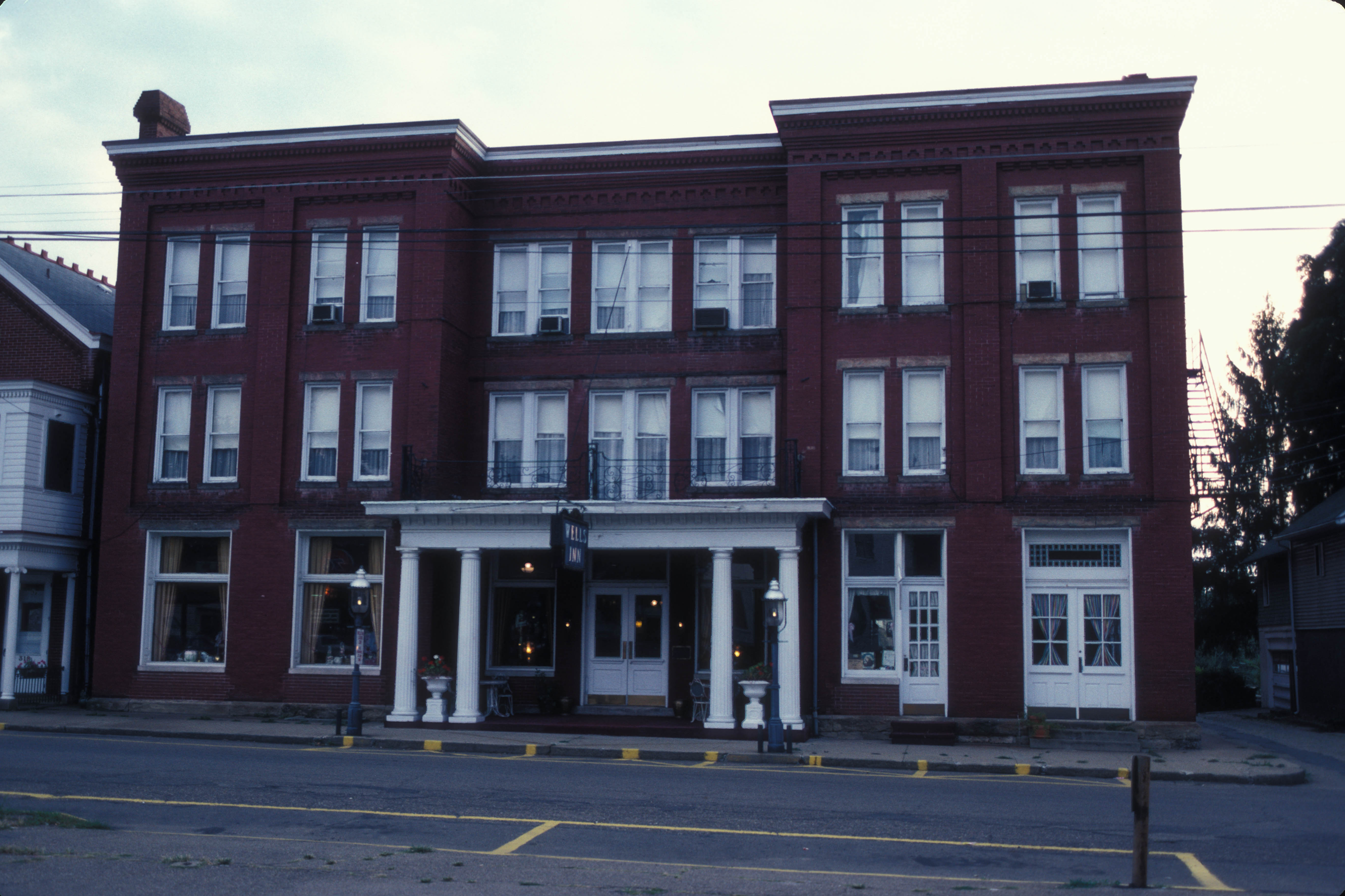

- Location within West Virginia Location within the United States
- Location: 316 Charles St., Sistersville, West Virginia
- Coordinates: 39°33′48″N 80°59′55″W
- Area: 0.7 acres (0.28 ha)
- Built: 1894
- Architect: O`Neil, W.H.; Rea, John
- NRHP reference No.: 72001293
- Added to NRHP: October 5, 1972

Wells Inn, also known as the Hotel Wells, is a historic hotel located at Sistersville, Tyler County, West Virginia, United States. It was built in 1894–1895, and is a two-story, brick building featuring a two-story verandah. The interior features decor of the 1890s, including a mosaic tile floor, oak furnishings, and a tiled fireplace. The hotel was undergoing renovation in 2010.

It was listed on the National Register of Historic Places in 1972.
