= Middlebourne, West Virginia =

- Town
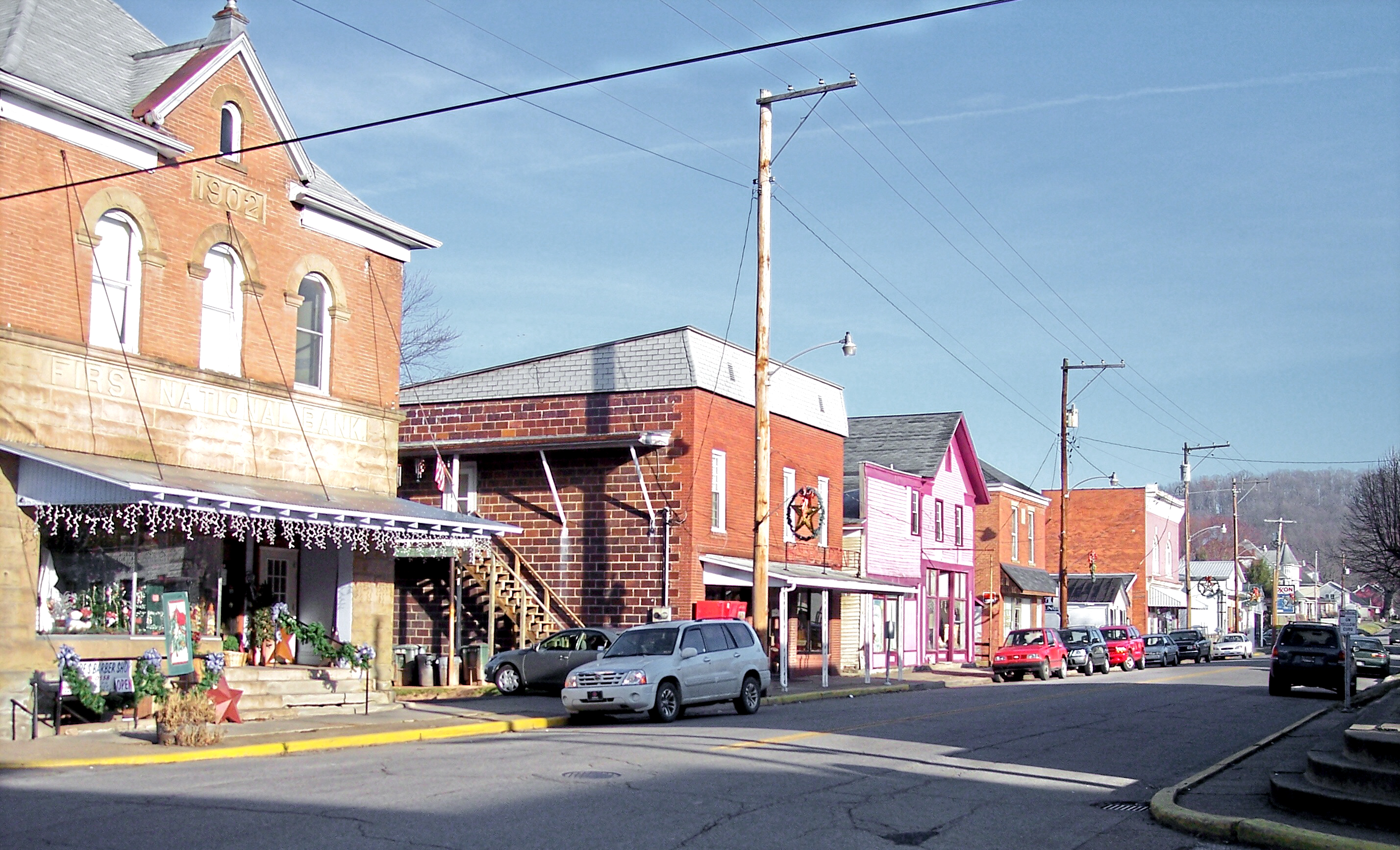
- Main Street in Middlebourne in 2006

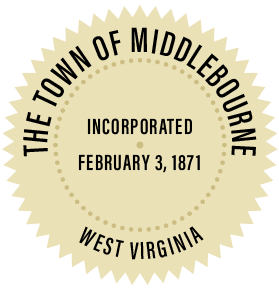
- Seal
- Interactive map of Middlebourne, West Virginia
- Location within West Virginia Location within the United States
- Coordinates: 39°29′38″N 80°54′21″W
- Country: United States
- State: West Virginia
- County: Tyler

Area
  - Total: 0.38 sq mi (0.98 km^{2})
  - Land: 0.36 sq mi (0.93 km^{2})
  - Water: 0.015 sq mi (0.04 km^{2})
- Elevation: 735 ft (224 m)

Population (2020)
  - Total: 717
  - Estimate (2021): 700
  - Density: 2,046.0/sq mi (789.98/km^{2})
- Time zone: UTC-5 (Eastern (EST))
  - Summer (DST): UTC-4 (EDT)
- ZIP code: 26149
- Area code: 304
- FIPS code: 54-53572
- GNIS feature ID: 1543226
- Website: middlebourne.wv.gov

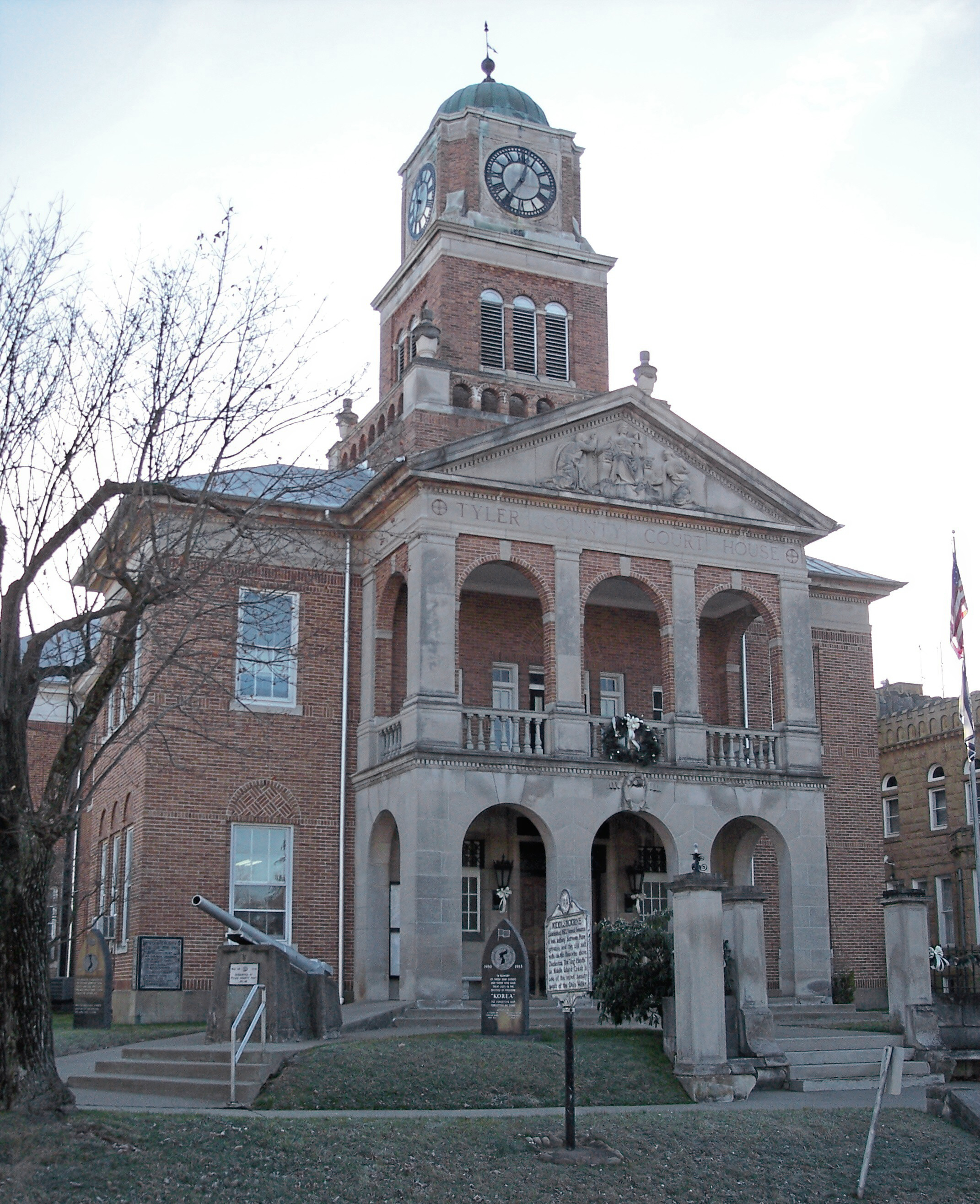
The Tyler County Courthouse in Middlebourne in 2006

Middlebourne is a town and the county seat of Tyler County, West Virginia, United States. The population was 715 at the 2020 census.

== History ==
Middlebourne was established by an enactment of the Virginia General Assembly in 1813. Two explanations have been given for the name of the town: One is that it was located halfway between Pennsylvania and a series of salt wells along the Kanawha River upstream of Charleston; the other is that it is located midway between the source and the mouth of Middle Island Creek, which flows through the town.

The Tyler County Courthouse and Jail is listed on the National Register of Historic Places.

== Geography ==
Middlebourne is located at 39°29′38″N 80°54′21″W (39.493966, -80.905751).

According to the United States Census Bureau, the town has a total area of 0.38 square miles (0.98 km^{2}), of which 0.36 square miles (0.93 km^{2}) is land and 0.02 square miles (0.05 km^{2}) is water.

=== Climate ===
The climate in this area is characterized by very warm, humid summers and cold to freezing winters. According to the Köppen Climate Classification system, Middlebourne has a humid continental climate, abbreviated Dfa on climate maps.

Climate data for Middlebourne, West Virginia (1991–2020 normals, extremes 1941–present)
Month	Jan	Feb	Mar	Apr	May	Jun	Jul	Aug	Sep	Oct	Nov	Dec	Year
Record high °F (°C)	79 (26)	80 (27)	87 (31)	92 (33)	96 (36)	98 (37)	103 (39)	101 (38)	103 (39)	93 (34)	85 (29)	78 (26)	103 (39)
Mean maximum °F (°C)	64.8 (18.2)	66.9 (19.4)	76.3 (24.6)	84.1 (28.9)	87.2 (30.7)	90.5 (32.5)	91.9 (33.3)	90.9 (32.7)	89.2 (31.8)	82.2 (27.9)	75.0 (23.9)	65.7 (18.7)	92.9 (33.8)
Mean daily maximum °F (°C)	39.1 (3.9)	42.7 (5.9)	52.4 (11.3)	65.4 (18.6)	73.8 (23.2)	80.8 (27.1)	84.1 (28.9)	83.2 (28.4)	77.4 (25.2)	66.0 (18.9)	53.7 (12.1)	43.5 (6.4)	63.5 (17.5)
Daily mean °F (°C)	29.3 (−1.5)	31.9 (−0.1)	40.1 (4.5)	51.2 (10.7)	60.7 (15.9)	68.6 (20.3)	72.6 (22.6)	71.4 (21.9)	64.8 (18.2)	53.0 (11.7)	41.9 (5.5)	34.1 (1.2)	51.6 (10.9)
Mean daily minimum °F (°C)	19.4 (−7.0)	21.1 (−6.1)	27.8 (−2.3)	36.9 (2.7)	47.6 (8.7)	56.4 (13.6)	61.1 (16.2)	59.6 (15.3)	52.1 (11.2)	39.9 (4.4)	30.1 (−1.1)	24.8 (−4.0)	39.7 (4.3)
Mean minimum °F (°C)	−2.5 (−19.2)	2.2 (−16.6)	11.4 (−11.4)	22.9 (−5.1)	32.6 (0.3)	43.4 (6.3)	50.9 (10.5)	50.0 (10.0)	39.2 (4.0)	26.8 (−2.9)	16.6 (−8.6)	7.2 (−13.8)	−6.2 (−21.2)
Record low °F (°C)	−34 (−37)	−18 (−28)	−14 (−26)	10 (−12)	22 (−6)	31 (−1)	37 (3)	38 (3)	28 (−2)	15 (−9)	−1 (−18)	−21 (−29)	−34 (−37)
Average precipitation inches (mm)	3.67 (93)	3.28 (83)	4.03 (102)	3.92 (100)	4.51 (115)	4.87 (124)	5.10 (130)	4.02 (102)	3.68 (93)	3.28 (83)	3.07 (78)	3.84 (98)	47.27 (1,201)
Average snowfall inches (cm)	11.0 (28)	7.7 (20)	4.1 (10)	0.1 (0.25)	0.0 (0.0)	0.0 (0.0)	0.0 (0.0)	0.0 (0.0)	0.0 (0.0)	0.0 (0.0)	0.5 (1.3)	3.9 (9.9)	27.3 (69)
Average precipitation days (≥ 0.01 in)	15.2	12.8	12.6	13.0	13.4	12.3	11.7	10.3	9.2	10.2	10.8	14.0	145.5
Average snowy days (≥ 0.1 in)	7.4	5.3	2.2	0.2	0.0	0.0	0.0	0.0	0.0	0.1	0.7	4.1	20.0
Source: NOAA

== Demographics ==
Historical population
Census	Pop.	Note	%±
1860	247		—
1870	182		−26.3%
1880	241		32.4%
1900	403		—
1910	540		34.0%
1920	929		72.0%
1930	769		−17.2%
1940	733		−4.7%
1950	741		1.1%
1960	711		−4.0%
1970	814		14.5%
1980	941		15.6%
1990	922		−2.0%
2000	870		−5.6%
2010	815		−6.3%
2020	717		−12.0%
2021 (est.)	700	▼	−2.4%
U.S. Decennial Census

=== 2010 census ===
At the 2010 census there were 815 people, 360 households, and 228 families living in the town. The population density was 2,263.9 inhabitants per square mile (874.1/km^{2}). There were 405 housing units at an average density of 1,125.0 per square mile (434.4/km^{2}). The racial makeup of the town was 99.3% White and 0.7% from two or more races. Hispanic or Latino of any race were 0.2%.

Of the 360 households 27.8% had children under the age of 18 living with them, 47.2% were married couples living together, 11.7% had a female householder with no husband present, 4.4% had a male householder with no wife present, and 36.7% were non-families. 35.3% of households were one person and 14.2% were one person aged 65 or older. The average household size was 2.25 and the average family size was 2.87.

The median age in the town was 42.5 years. 23.7% of residents were under the age of 18; 6.4% were between the ages of 18 and 24; 22.7% were from 25 to 44; 29% were from 45 to 64; and 18% were 65 or older. The gender makeup of the town was 46.0% male and 54.0% female.

=== 2000 census ===
At the 2000 census there were 870 people, 370 households, and 247 families living in the town. The population density was 2,320.0 inhabitants per square mile (907.9/km^{2}). There were 402 housing units at an average density of 1,072.0 per square mile (419.5/km^{2}). The racial makeup of the town was 99.54% White, and 0.46% from two or more races. Of the 370 households 30.0% had children under the age of 18 living with them, 51.9% were married couples living together, 11.9% had a female householder with no husband present, and 33.2% were non-families. 31.4% of households were one person and 16.8% were one person aged 65 or older. The average household size was 2.31 and the average family size was 2.89.

The age distribution was 23.3% under the age of 18, 7.5% from 18 to 24, 25.1% from 25 to 44, 28.7% from 45 to 64, and 15.4% 65 or older. The median age was 42 years. For every 100 females, there were 85.1 males. For every 100 females age 18 and over, there were 80.3 males.

The median household income was $128,704 and the median family income was $40,893. Males had a median income of $35,000 versus $19,167 for females. The per capita income for the town was $14,673. About 12.6% of families and 13.9% of the population were below the poverty line, including 18.3% of those under age 18 and 11.9% of those age 65 or over.
