= 2011 World Championships in Athletics – Women's pole vault =

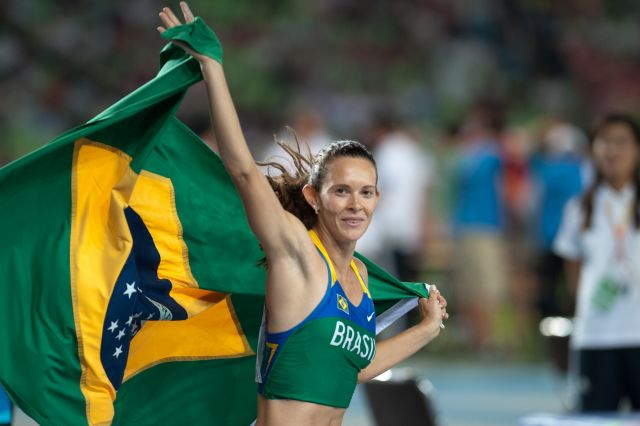
Fabiana Murer celebrating her victory at Daegu

Official Video

The Women's Pole vault event at the 2011 World Championships in Athletics took place at the Daegu Stadium on August 28 and 30.

Anna Rogowska of Poland was the defending champion, while 2008 Olympic champion Yelena Isinbayeva had returned to form after a career break in 2010. American Jennifer Suhr had the two best clearances prior to the competition and Martina Strutz was ranked second in the world behind her. Silke Spiegelburg (the Diamond League leader), world indoor champion Fabiana Murer and Olympic medalist Svetlana Feofanova were the other main potential medalists.

The event was conducted in swirling winds. World record holder Isinbayeva was the last to start, clearing her opening height but then struggling with her next three attempts, going under the bar on the last one. World leader Suhr seemed off this night but cleared 4.70 on her second attempt, while Yarisley Silva set the Cuban national record at the same height on her third attempt. Murer and previous world record holder Feofanova were clean through 4.75, but were pushed into a tie for second place by Strutz' German National Record 4.80 on her first attempt. Murer cleared on her second attempt while Feofanova missed all three attempts. At 4.85 Murer tied her own National and Area record, clearing on her first attempt and making Strutz pass to 4.90 to try to win. Neither cleared on their two attempts, then Murer had the bar raised to 4.92 for her final attempt.

== Medalists ==
Gold	Silver	Bronze
Fabiana Murer; Brazil	Martina Strutz; Germany	Svetlana Feofanova; Russia

== Records ==
Prior to the competition, the established records were as follows.

World record	Elena Isinbaeva (RUS)	5.06	Zürich, Switzerland	28 August 2009
Championship record	Elena Isinbaeva (RUS)	5.01	Helsinki, Finland	12 August 2005
World leading	Jennifer Suhr (USA)	4.91	Rochester, NY, United States	8 July 2011
African record	Elmarie Gerryts (RSA)	4.42	Wesel, Germany	12 June 2000
Asian record	Shuying Gao (CHN)	4.62	New York City, NY, United States	2 June 2007
North, Central American and Caribbean record	Jennifer Suhr (USA)	4.91	Eugene, OR, United States	6 July 2008
South American record	Fabiana Murer (BRA)	4.85	San Fernando, Cádiz, Spain	4 June 2010
European record	Elena Isinbaeva (RUS)	5.06	Zürich, Switzerland	28 August 2009
Oceanian record	Kym Howe (AUS)	4.65	Saulheim, Germany	30 June 2007

== Qualification standards ==
A standard	B standard
4.50	4.40

== Schedule ==
Date	Time	Round
August 28, 2011	09:30	Qualification
August 30, 2011	19:05	Final

== Results ==
=== Qualification ===
Qualification: Qualifying Performance 4.60 (Q) or at least 12 best performers (q) advance to the final.

Rank	Group	Name	Nationality	4.10	4.25	4.40	4.50	4.55	Result	Notes
1	B	Yelena Isinbayeva	Russia	-	-	-	-	o	4.55	q
1	B	Fabiana Murer	Brazil	-	-	-	-	o	4.55	q
1	B	Anna Rogowska	Poland	-	-	o	-	o	4.55	q
1	A	Martina Strutz	Germany	-	-	o	o	o	4.55	q
5	B	Jiřina Ptáčníková	Czech Republic	-	o	xo	o	o	4.55	q
6	A	Jenn Suhr	United States	-	-	-	xxo	o	4.55	q
7	A	Svetlana Feofanova	Russia	-	-	o	-	xo	4.55	q
7	A	Silke Spiegelburg	Germany	-	-	o	o	xo	4.55	q
9	B	Yarisley Silva	Cuba	-	-	xo	xo	xo	4.55	q
10	B	Nikoleta Kyriakopoulou	Greece	-	o	xxo	o	xxo	4.55	q
11	A	Monika Pyrek	Poland	-	o	o	o	xxx	4.50	q
11	B	Kristina Gadschiew	Germany	-	-	o	o	xxx	4.50	q
13	A	Alana Boyd	Australia	o	xo	o	xo	xxx	4.50	
13	B	Kate Dennison	Great Britain & N.I.	-	o	xo	xo	-	4.50	
15	A	Kylie Hutson	United States	-	o	o	xxo	xxx	4.50	
16	B	Nicole Büchler	Switzerland	o	o	xxo	xxo	xxx	4.50	=NR
17	A	Anna Katharina Schmid	Switzerland	o	o	o	xxx		4.40	
18	A	Anastasiya Shvedova	Belarus	-	xo	o	xx		4.40	
18	B	Choi Yun-hee	South Korea	o	xo	o	xxx		4.40	=NR
20	B	Lacy Janson	United States	-	xxo	o	xxx		4.40	
21	A	Tina Šutej	Slovenia	o	o	xo	xxx		4.40	
22	B	Anna Giordano Bruno	Italy	o	o	xxo	xxx		4.40	
23	A	Dailis Caballero	Cuba	o	xxo	xxo	xxx		4.40	
24	A	Kelsie Hendry	Canada	-	o	xxx			4.25	
25	A	Malin Dahlström	Sweden	o	xo	xxx			4.25	
25	B	Caroline Bonde Holm	Denmark	o	xo	xxx			4.25	
25	B	Jillian Schwartz	Israel	o	xo	xxx			4.25	
25	A	Maria Leonor Tavares	Portugal	o	xo	xxx			4.25	
29	B	Li Ling	China	o	xxo	xxx			4.25	
30	B	Tori Pena	Ireland	o	xxx				4.10	
	A	Holly Bleasdale	Great Britain & N.I.	-	xxx				NM	
	A	Cathrine Larsåsen	Norway	xxx					NM	
	B	Ana Piñero	Spain	-	xxx				NM	
	A	Wu Sha	China						DNS	
	B	Minna Nikkanen	Finland						DNS	

=== Final ===
Rank	Name	Nationality	4.30	4.45	4.55	4.65	4.70	4.75	4.80	4.85	4.90	4.92	Result	Notes
1st place, gold medalist(s)	Fabiana Murer	Brazil	-	-	o	o	-	o	xo	o	xx-	x	4.85	=AR
2nd place, silver medalist(s)	Martina Strutz	Germany	-	xo	o	o	o	xo	o	x-	xx		4.80	NR
3rd place, bronze medalist(s)	Svetlana Feofanova	Russia	-	o	o	o	-	o	xxx				4.75	SB
4	Jenn Suhr	United States	-	-	o	-	xo	xxx					4.70	
5	Yarisley Silva	Cuba	-	o	o	o	xxo	-	xxx				4.70	NR
6	Yelena Isinbayeva	Russia	-	-	-	o	-	x-	xx				4.65	
7	Jiřina Ptáčníková	Czech Republic	o	o	xo	o	xxx						4.65	SB
8	Nikoleta Kyriakopoulou	Greece	o	-	o	xo	xxx						4.65	
9	Silke Spiegelburg	Germany	-	xxo	xo	xxo	xxx						4.65	
10	Kristina Gadschiew	Germany	o	o	o	xxx							4.55	
10	Monika Pyrek	Poland	-	o	o	xxx							4.55	
10	Anna Rogowska	Poland	-	o	o	-	xxx						4.55	
