= Athletics at the 2012 Summer Olympics – Women's pole vault =

Women's pole vault at the Games of the XXX Olympiad
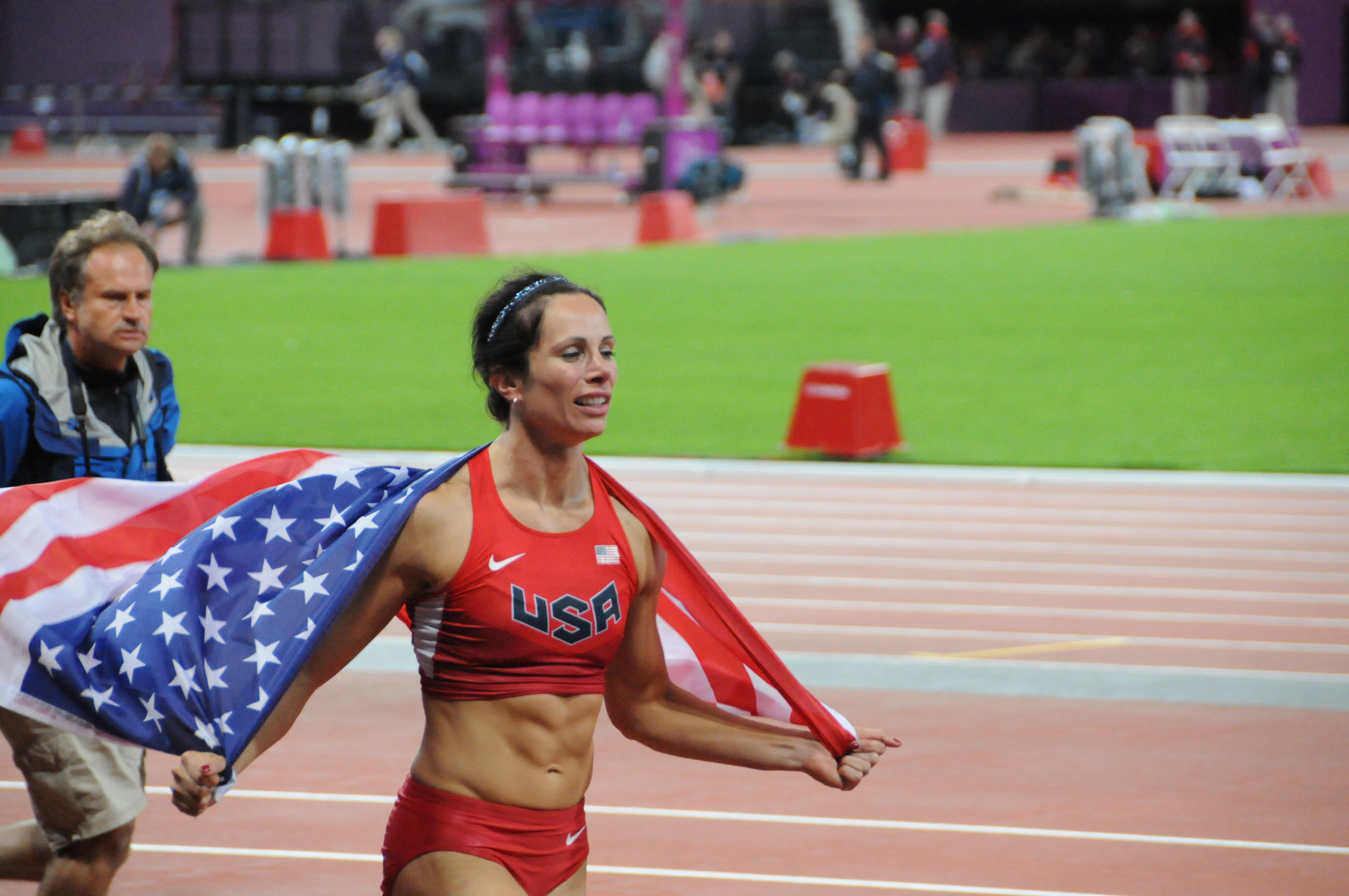
- Venue: Olympic Stadium
- Date: 4–6 August 2012
- Competitors: 39 from 25 nations
- Winning height: 4.75 m

Medalists
1st place, gold medalist(s)		Jennifer Suhr	United States
2nd place, silver medalist(s)		Yarisley Silva	Cuba
3rd place, bronze medalist(s)		Yelena Isinbayeva	Russia

Official Video Highlights

The women's pole vault competition at the 2012 Summer Olympics in London, United Kingdom, was held at the Olympic Stadium on 4–6 August.

In the qualifying round, the 12 competitors who cleared 4.55 went into the final. Non-qualifiers included junior record holder Angelica Bengtsson, former world record holder Svetlana Feofanova and reigning world champion Fabiana Murer.

Wind and rain made conditions difficult in the final. The gold medal was won by Jennifer Suhr who cleared 4.75, silver by Yarisley Silva who also cleared 4.75, but had one more missed attempt at a lower height and bronze by two-time reigning champion Yelena Isinbaeva who cleared 4.70.

== Competition format ==
The competition consisted of two rounds, qualification and final. In qualification, each athlete had three attempts at each height and was eliminated if they failed to clear any height. Athletes who successfully jumped the qualifying height moved on the final. If fewer than 12 reached that height, the best 12 moved on. Cleared heights reset for the final, which followed the same three-attempts-per-height format until all athletes reached a height they could not jump.

== Schedule ==
All times are British Summer Time (UTC+1)

Date	Time	Round
Saturday, 4 August 2012	10:20	Qualifications
Monday, 6 August 2012	19:00	Finals

== Records ==
Prior to the competition, the existing World and Olympic records were as follows.

World record	Yelena Isinbayeva (RUS)	5.06 m	Zürich, Switzerland	28 August 2009
Olympic record	Yelena Isinbayeva (RUS)	5.05 m	Beijing, China	18 August 2008
2012 World leading	Jennifer Suhr (USA)	4.83 m	Champaign, United States	7 July 2012

== Results ==
Key

- o = Height cleared
- x = Height failed
- – = Height passed
- r = Retired
- SB = Season's best
- PB = Personal best
- NR = National record
- AR = Area record
- OR = Olympic record
- WR = World record
- WL = World lead
- NM = No mark
- DNS = Did not start
- DQ = Disqualified

=== Qualifying round ===
Qual. rule: qualification standard 4.60m (Q) or at least best 12 qualified (q).

Rank	Group	Name	Nationality	4.10	4.25	4.40	4.50	4.55	Result	Notes
1	B	Yelena Isinbayeva	Russia	–	–	–	o	o	4.55	q
1	A	Yarisley Silva	Cuba	–	–	–	o	o	4.55	q
1	A	Jennifer Suhr	United States	–	–	–	–	o	4.55	q
4	A	Lisa Ryzih	Germany	–	–	o	xo	o	4.55	q
5	B	Anna Rogowska	Poland	–	–	xo	xo	o	4.55	q
6	B	Silke Spiegelburg	Germany	–	–	–	o	xo	4.55	q
7	A	Holly Bleasdale	Great Britain	–	–	xo	o	xo	4.55	q
7	A	Vanessa Boslak	France	–	o	xo	o	xo	4.55	q
7	A	Martina Strutz	Germany	–	o	o	xo	xo	4.55	q
10	B	Becky Holliday	United States	–	xo	xxo	o	xo	4.55	q
11	A	Alana Boyd	Australia	–	o	xxo	xxo	xo	4.55	q
12	B	Jiřina Ptáčníková	Czech Republic	–	–	xo	xo	xxo	4.55	q
13	B	Stélla-Iró Ledáki	Greece	xxo	o	xo	o	xxx	4.50	
14	B	Fabiana Murer	Brazil	–	–	–	xo	xxx	4.50	
15	B	Lacy Janson	United States	–	o	o	xxx		4.40	
15	A	Monika Pyrek	Poland	–	o	o	xxx		4.40	
17	A	Anastasiya Shvedova	Belarus	–	xo	o	–	xxx	4.40	
18	A	Jillian Schwartz	Israel	o	xxo	o	xxx		4.40	
19	A	Tomomi Abiko	Japan	o	o	xxx			4.25	
19	A	Angelica Bengtsson	Sweden	–	o	xxx			4.25	
19	B	Mélanie Blouin	Canada	o	o	xxx			4.25	
19	B	Nikoleta Kyriakopoulou	Greece	–	o	xxx			4.25	
19	A	Tina Šutej	Slovenia	o	o	xxx			4.25	
24	A	Katerina Stefanidi	Greece	xo	o	xxx			4.25	
25	B	Nicole Büchler	Switzerland	xxo	o	xxx			4.25	
26	B	Kate Dennison	Great Britain	–	xo	xxx			4.25	
26	B	Nataliya Mazuryk	Ukraine	–	xo	xxx			4.25	
26	A	Minna Nikkanen	Finland	o	xo	xxx			4.25	
26	A	Anastasia Savchenko	Russia	–	xo	xxx			4.25	
30	A	Li Ling	China	–	xxo	xxx			4.25	
31	A	Choi Yun-Hee	South Korea	xo	xxx				4.10	
31	A	Maria Leonor Tavares	Portugal	xo	xxx				4.10	
33	B	Marion Lotout	France	xxo	xxx				4.10	
33	A	Ganna Shelekh	Ukraine	xxo	–	xxx			4.10	
—	B	Dailis Caballero	Cuba	xxx					NM	
—	B	Svetlana Feofanova	Russia	–	–	xx–	x		NM	
—	B	Caroline Bonde Holm	Denmark	xxx					NM	
—	B	Liz Parnov	Australia	xxx					NM	
—	B	Tori Pena	Ireland	xxx					NM	

=== Final ===
Rank	Name	Nationality	4.30	4.45	4.55	4.65	4.70	4.75	4.80	Result	Notes
1st place, gold medalist(s)	Jennifer Suhr	United States	–	–	o	–	o	xo	xxx	4.75	
2nd place, silver medalist(s)	Yarisley Silva	Cuba	–	xo	o	o	o	xo	xxx	4.75	=NR
3rd place, bronze medalist(s)	Yelena Isinbayeva	Russia	–	–	x–	o	o	xx–	x	4.70	
4	Silke Spiegelburg	Germany	–	–	o	o	x–	xx		4.65	
5	Martina Strutz	Germany	–	xo	o	x–	xx			4.55	
6	Jiřina Ptáčníková	Czech Republic	o	xxo	xx–	x				4.45	
6	Lisa Ryzih	Germany	–	xxo	xxx					4.45	
6	Holly Bleasdale	Great Britain	–	xxo	xxx					4.45	
9	Becky Holliday	United States	xo	xxo	xxx					4.45	
10	Vanessa Boslak	France	xo	xxx						4.30	
11	Alana Boyd	Australia	xxo	xxx						4.30	
—	Anna Rogowska	Poland	–	xxx						NM	
