= 2009 European Athletics Indoor Championships – Women's pole vault =

The women's pole vault event at the 2009 European Athletics Indoor Championships was held on 6 and 7 March.

== Medalists ==
Gold	Silver	Bronze
Yuliya Golubchikova; Russia	Silke Spiegelburg; Germany	Anna Battke; Germany

== Results ==
=== Qualification ===
Qualification: Qualification Performance 4.45 (Q) or at least 8 best performers advanced to the final.

Rank	Athlete	Nationality	3.55	3.80	4.05	4.25	4.35	4.40	Result	Notes
1	Aleksandra Kiryashova	Russia	–	–	–	o	–	o	4.40	q
1	Anna Giordano Bruno	Italy	–	o	o	o	o	o	4.40	q, NR
1	Kristina Gadschiew	Germany	–	–	–	o	o	o	4.40	q
1	Yuliya Golubchikova	Russia	–	–	–	o	–	o	4.40	q
5	Anna Battke	Germany	–	–	–	–	–	xo	4.40	q
6	Kate Dennison	Great Britain	–	–	o	o	xo	xo	4.40	q
7	Joanna Piwowarska	Poland	–	–	o	o	o	xxo	4.40	q
8	Silke Spiegelburg	Germany	–	–	–	o	o	–	4.35	q
9	Maria Eleonor Tavares	Portugal	–	o	xo	o	o	xxx	4.35	PB
10	Minna Nikkanen	Finland	–	–	xo	xxo	o	xxx	4.35	NR
11	Mariánna Zahariádi	Cyprus	–	–	o	xo	xxo	xxx	4.35	
12	Nikolia Kiriakopoulou	Greece	–	–	o	xxo	xxo	xxx	4.35	
13	Elena Scarpellini	Italy	–	o	o	o	xx–	x	4.25	
13	Jiřina Ptáčníková	Czech Republic	–	–	o	o	xxx		4.25	
15	Nicole Büchler	Switzerland	–	–	o	xxo	xxx		4.25	
16	Elisabete Tavares Ansel	Portugal	–	o	o	xxx			4.05	
17	Caroline Bonde Holm	Denmark	–	xo	o	xxx			4.05	
18	Cathrine Larsåsen	Norway	–	–	xo	xxx			4.05	
18	Zoë Brown	Ireland	–	o	xo	xxx			4.05	
20	Zhanna Barrer	Israel	o	o	xxx				3.80	=NR

=== Final ===
Rank	Athlete	Nationality	4.20	4.35	4.50	4.60	4.65	4.70	4.75	4.80	Result	Notes
1st place, gold medalist(s)	Yuliya Golubchikova	Russia	–	o	o	o	o	o	xxo	xxx	4.75	SB
2nd place, silver medalist(s)	Silke Spiegelburg	Germany	–	o	o	xo	o	o	xxo	xxx	4.75	NR
3rd place, bronze medalist(s)	Anna Battke	Germany	–	o	xo	o	o	–	xxx		4.65	PB
4	Aleksandra Kiryashova	Russia	xo	o	xo	xxx					4.50	
5	Kristina Gadschiew	Germany	o	o	xxx						4.35	
6	Kate Dennison	Great Britain	o	xo	xxx						4.35	
7	Joanna Piwowarska	Poland	xo	xo	xxx						4.35	
	Anna Giordano Bruno	Italy	xxx								NM	
