= 2009 World Championships in Athletics – Women's pole vault =

The Women's Pole Vault event at the 2009 World Championships in Berlin, Germany was held between 15 August and 17 August 2009. Yelena Isinbayeva was the strong favourite prior to the competition, a position enhanced further by the withdrawal of 2008 Olympic silver medallist Jennifer Stuczynski. Anna Rogowska was the only athlete to beat Isinbayeva in the buildup to the event. Fabiana Murer and Monika Pyrek had both registered strong season's bests but had suffered from indifferent form. European Indoor medallists Yuliya Golubchikova and Silke Spiegelburg rounded out the list of the season's highest jumping athletes.

In the qualifiers, the automatic progression mark of 4.60 m was not needed, as eleven athletes reached 4.55 m and Kristina Gadschiew progressed with 4.50 m. All four Russian athletes reached the final, as did all three vaulters of the host nation's team. Veteran American athlete and former world record holder Stacy Dragila closed her major championship career with a jump of 4.25 m, as she announced her intention to retire at the end of the season.

On the final day of the event, European Indoor champion Golubchikova was the first to experience disappointment, as a fall in the warm up left her unable to compete in the final. The Brazilian and British champions, Murer and Kate Dennison failed at the 4.65 m mark. Pyrek and American Chelsea Johnson passed that height on their first attempt, while Rogowska and home favourite Spiegelburg completed it on their second try. Rogowska was the only athlete to vault 4.75 m, at which point reigning champion Isinbayeva entered the competition. The Russian failed to clear the height and, after raising the bar, failed twice more and finished last in the competition.

Given that Isinbayeva had a season's best of 4.80 m, an opener of 4.75 m was a risky decision that back fired for the athlete, resulting in her first major championship loss since 2003 and her first ever non-medalling performance in international competition. Rogowska, who had beaten her at the London Grand Prix a month earlier, won her first gold medal at a major championships, breaking Isinbayeva's dominance of the event. Pyrek repeated her form of the 2005 Championships to take a silver medal along with Chelsea Johnson, a relatively unknown athlete competing at her first major championships. For the first time in history of World Championships in Athletics, two Polish athletes took gold and silver medal in the same event.

== Medalists ==
Gold	Anna Rogowska; Poland (POL)
Silver	Monika Pyrek; Poland (POL)
Silver	Chelsea Johnson; United States (USA)

== Records ==
World record	Yelena Isinbayeva (RUS)	5.05	Beijing, China	18 August 2008
Championship record	Yelena Isinbayeva (RUS)	5.01	Helsinki, Finland	12 August 2005
World Leading	Yelena Isinbayeva (RUS)	4.85	Rome, Italy	10 July 2009
African Record	Elmarie Gerryts (RSA)	4.42	Wesel, Germany	12 June 2000
Asian Record	Gao Shuying (CHN)	4.64	New York, United States	2 June 2007
North American record	Jennifer Stuczynski (USA)	4.92	Eugene, United States	6 July 2008
South American record	Fabiana Murer (BRA)	4.82	Rio de Janeiro, Brazil	7 June 2009
European Record	Yelena Isinbayeva (RUS)	5.05	Beijing, China	18 August 2008
Oceanian Record	Kym Howe (AUS)	4.65	Saulheim, Germany	30 June 2007

== Qualification standards ==
A standard	B standard
4.45m	4.35m

== Schedule ==
Date	Time	Round
August 15, 2009	19:00	Qualification
August 17, 2009	18:45	Final

== Results ==
=== Qualification ===
Qualification: Qualifying Performance 4.60 (Q) or at least 12 best performers (q) advance to the final.

Rank	Group	Name	Nationality	4.10	4.25	4.40	4.50	4.55	Result	Notes
1	A	Fabiana Murer	Brazil	-	-	o	o	o	4.55	q
1	A	Anna Rogowska	Poland	-	-	o	-	o	4.55	q
1	A	Yuliya Golubchikova	Russia	-	-	o	-	o	4.55	q
1	B	Silke Spiegelburg	Germany	-	-	o	o	o	4.55	q
1	B	Yelena Isinbayeva	Russia	-	-	-	-	o	4.55	q
6	B	Chelsea Johnson	United States	-	xxo	o	o	o	4.55	q
7	A	Kate Dennison	Great Britain & N.I.	o	o	o	xo	o	4.55	q
7	A	Anna Battke	Germany	-	o	o	xo	o	4.55	q
9	A	Tatyana Polnova	Russia	o	xo	xo	xo	o	4.55	q
10	B	Monika Pyrek	Poland	-	-	o	xo	xo	4.55	q
11	B	Aleksandra Kiryashova	Russia	-	o	o	xo	xxo	4.55	q
12	B	Kristina Gadschiew	Germany	-	o	o	o	xxx	4.50	q
13	A	Anna Giordano Bruno	Italy	o	xo	xo	o	xxx	4.50	
14	B	Jillian Schwartz	United States	-	o	xo	xo	xxx	4.50	
15	A	Nicole Büchler	Switzerland	o	o	o	xo	xxx	4.50	NR
16	B	Kelsie Hendry	Canada	-	o	o	xxx		4.40	
16	B	Jiřina Ptáčníková	Czech Republic	-	o	o	xxx		4.40	
18	B	Li Ling	China	o	o	xo	xxx		4.40	SB
19	B	Nikoléta Kiriakopoúlou	Greece	o	xo	xo	xxx		4.40	
20	B	Minna Nikkanen	Finland	o	o	xxo	xxx		4.40	
21	B	Naroa Agirre	Spain	o	xo	xxo	xxx		4.40	SB
22	A	Joanna Piwowarska	Poland	o	o	xxx			4.25	
22	A	Stacy Dragila	United States	-	o	xxx			4.25	
24	A	Mariánna Zaharíadi	Cyprus	xo	xo	xxx			4.25	
24	B	Roslinda Samsu	Malaysia	xo	xo	xxx			4.25	
26	A	Sandra-Helena Tavares	Portugal	xo	xxo	xxx			4.25	
28	A	Télie Mathiot	France	o	xxx				4.10	
28	B	Takayo Kondo	Japan	o	xxx				4.10	
30	A	Romana Maláčová	Czech Republic	xo	xxx				4.10	
30	B	Lim Eun-Ji	South Korea	xo	xxx				4.10	
	A	Gao Shuying	China	-	xxx				NM	

Key: NM = no mark (i.e. no valid result), NR = National record, q = qualification by overall place, SB = Seasonal best

=== Final ===
Rank	Name	Nationality	4.25	4.40	4.55	4.65	4.75	4.80	Result	Notes
1st place, gold medalist(s)	Anna Rogowska	Poland	-	o	o	xo	o	xx-	4.75	
2nd place, silver medalist(s)	Monika Pyrek	Poland	-	o	o	o	xx-	x	4.65	
2nd place, silver medalist(s)	Chelsea Johnson	United States	-	o	o	o	xxx		4.65	SB
4	Silke Spiegelburg	Germany	-	o	xo	xo	xxx		4.65	
5	Fabiana Murer	Brazil	-	o	o	xxx			4.55	
6	Kate Dennison	Great Britain & N.I.	o	o	xo	xxx			4.55	
7	Anna Battke	Germany	-	o	xxx				4.40	
7	Tatyana Polnova	Russia	o	o	xxx				4.40	
9	Aleksandra Kiryashova	Russia	xo	xo	xxx				4.40	
10	Kristina Gadschiew	Germany	o	xxo	xxx				4.40	
	Yelena Isinbayeva	Russia	-	-	-	-	x-	xx	NM	
	Yuliya Golubchikova	Russia							DNS	

Key: DNS = Did not start, NM = no mark (i.e. no valid result), SB = Seasonal best
