= 2006 European Athletics Championships – Women's pole vault =

Women's pole vault at the European Athletics Championships

The women's pole vault at the 2006 European Athletics Championships were held at the Ullevi on August 9 and August 12. Isinbayeva tried three times to set the new world record (5.02) but failed.

== Medalists ==
| Gold | Silver | Bronze |
|---|---|---|
| Yelena Isinbayeva; Russia | Monika Pyrek; Poland | Tatyana Polnova; Russia |

== Schedule ==
| Date | Time | Round |
|---|---|---|
| August 9, 2006 | 10:35 | Qualification |
| August 12, 2006 | 15:00 | Final |

== Results ==
=== Qualification ===
Qualification: Qualifying Performance 4.40 (Q) or at least 12 best performers (q) advance to the final.

| Rank | Group | Name | Nationality | 3.80 | 4.00 | 4.15 | 4.30 | 4.35 | 4.40 | Result | Notes |
|---|---|---|---|---|---|---|---|---|---|---|---|
| 1 | B | Monika Pyrek | Poland | - | - | - | o | - | o | 4.40 | Q |
| 1 | B | Svetlana Feofanova | Russia | - | - | - | - | - | o | 4.40 | Q |
| 1 | B | Tatyana Polnova | Russia | - | - | - | o | - | o | 4.40 | Q |
| 4 | A | Róża Kasprzak | Poland | - | xo | o | o | - | o | 4.40 | Q |
| 4 | A | Krisztina Molnár | Hungary | - | o | o | xo | - | o | 4.40 | Q |
| 4 | B | Martina Strutz | Germany | - | - | o | xo | o | o | 4.40 | Q |
| 7 | A | Naroa Agirre | Spain | - | o | o | o | o | xo | 4.40 | Q |
| 7 | A | Yelena Isinbayeva | Russia | - | - | - | - | - | xo | 4.40 | Q |
| 9 | B | Silke Spiegelburg | Germany | - | - | o | o | xo | xxo | 4.40 | Q |
| 10 | B | Pavla Hamáčková | Czech Republic | - | - | o | o | o | xxx | 4.35 | q |
| 11 | A | Nastja Ryjikh | Germany | - | - | - | o | - | xxx | 4.30 | q |
| 12 | A | Joanna Piwowarska | Poland | - | o | o | xo | - | xxx | 4.30 | q |
| 13 | B | Hanna-Mia Persson | Sweden | - | xxo | xo | xo | xxx | | 4.30 | |
| 14 | A | Maria Rendin | Sweden | o | xxo | xxo | xo | xxx | | 4.30 | PB |
| 15 | A | Kate Dennison | United Kingdom | - | o | o | xxo | x- | xx | 4.30 | |
| 16 | B | Kateřina Baďurová | Czech Republic | - | o | xo | xxo | xxx | | 4.30 | |
| 17 | A | Vanessa Boslak | France | - | - | o | xxx | | | 4.15 | |
| 17 | A | Slavica Semenjuk | Serbia | o | o | o | xxx | | | 4.15 | |
| 17 | B | Linda Persson | Sweden | o | o | o | xxx | | | 4.15 | |
| 20 | B | Anna Giordano Bruno | Italy | o | o | xo | xxx | | | 4.15 | |
| 21 | A | Arianna Farfalletti-Casali | Italy | o | o | xxx | | | | 4.00 | |
| 21 | A | Elisabete Tavares | Portugal | o | o | xxx | | | | 4.00 | |
| 23 | B | Rianna Galiart | Netherlands | xxo | o | xxx | | | | 4.00 | |
| 23 | B | Anita Tørring | Denmark | xxo | o | xxx | | | | 4.00 | |
| 25 | B | Dana Cervantes | Spain | xxo | xo | xxx | | | | 4.00 | |
| 26 | B | Ellie Spain | United Kingdom | o | xxo | xxx | | | | 4.00 | |
| 27 | A | Jiřina Ptáčníková | Czech Republic | o | xxx | | | | | 3.80 | |

=== Final ===
| Rank | Name | Nationality | 4.10 | 4.20 | 4.30 | 4.35 | 4.40 | 4.45 | 4.50 | 4.55 | 4.60 | 4.65 | 4.70 | 4.75 | 4.80 | 5.02 | Result | Notes |
|---|---|---|---|---|---|---|---|---|---|---|---|---|---|---|---|---|---|---|
| 1st place, gold medalist(s) | Yelena Isinbayeva | Russia | - | - | - | - | - | - | - | - | o | - | xo | - | xo | xxx | 4.80 | CR |
| 2nd place, silver medalist(s) | Monika Pyrek | Poland | - | - | - | - | xo | - | o | - | o | o | xx- | - | x | | 4.65 | |
| 3rd place, bronze medalist(s) | Tatyana Polnova | Russia | - | - | o | - | o | - | xxo | o | o | o | xxx | | | | 4.65 | SB |
| 4 | Svetlana Feofanova | Russia | - | - | - | - | o | - | o | - | x- | x- | x | | | | 4.50 | |
| 5 | Martina Strutz | Germany | o | - | xo | - | o | xo | xxo | xxx | | | | | | | 4.50 | PB |
| 6 | Silke Spiegelburg | Germany | - | xo | xo | - | xxo | - | xxo | xxx | | | | | | | 4.50 | |
| 7 | Naroa Agirre | Spain | o | o | o | - | o | xxo | xxx | | | | | | | | 4.45 | |
| 8 | Róża Kasprzak | Poland | o | - | o | - | xo | - | xxx | | | | | | | | 4.40 | |
| 9 | Nastja Ryjikh | Germany | - | o | - | o | - | xxx | | | | | | | | | 4.35 | |
| 10 | Pavla Hamáčková | Czech Republic | - | xo | - | xo | - | xxx | | | | | | | | | 4.35 | |
| 11 | Krisztina Molnár | Hungary | o | o | xo | - | xxx | | | | | | | | | | 4.30 | |
| | Joanna Piwowarska | Poland | xxx | | | | | | | | | | | | | | NM | |
