= 2002 World Junior Championships in Athletics – Women's pole vault =

The women's pole vault event at the 2002 World Junior Championships in Athletics was held in Kingston, Jamaica, at National Stadium on 16 and 18 July.

== Medalists ==
Gold	Floé Kühnert; Germany
Silver	Yuliya Golubchikova; Russia
Bronze	Natalya Belinskaya; Russia

== Results ==
=== Final ===
18 July

Rank	Name	Nationality	Result	Notes
1st place, gold medalist(s)	Floé Kühnert	Germany	4.40	
2nd place, silver medalist(s)	Yuliya Golubchikova	Russia	4.30	
3rd place, bronze medalist(s)	Natalya Belinskaya	Russia	4.20	
4	Dímitra Emmanouíl	Greece	4.10	
5	Anna Huculak	Poland	4.00	
6	Natalya Kushch	Ukraine	4.00	
7	Kate Dennison	United Kingdom	4.00	
8	Silke Spiegelburg	Germany	3.90	
9	Sirine Balti	Tunisia	3.90	
10	Karla da Silva	Brazil	3.80	
11	Janna Barer	Israel	3.80	
	Jirina Ptácníková	Czech Republic	NH	
	Lacy Janson	United States	NH	

=== Qualifications ===
16 Jul

==== Group A ====
Rank	Name	Nationality	Result	Notes
1	Natalya Belinskaya	Russia	3.90	q
2	Karla da Silva	Brazil	3.90	q
3	Silke Spiegelburg	Germany	3.90	q
3	Lacy Janson	United States	3.90	q
5	Janna Barer	Israel	3.90	q
6	Dímitra Emmanouíl	Greece	3.90	q
7	Jirina Ptácníková	Czech Republic	3.80	q
8	Wendy Young	Australia	3.80	
8	Gemma Pagés	Spain	3.80	
8	Joanna Piwowarska	Poland	3.80	
11	Eleonor Tavares	Portugal	3.60	
	Annelie van Wyk	South Africa	NH	

==== Group B ====
Rank	Name	Nationality	Result	Notes
1	Floé Kühnert	Germany	3.90	q
1	Anna Huculak	Poland	3.90	q
1	Yuliya Golubchikova	Russia	3.90	q
1	Natalya Kushch	Ukraine	3.90	q
5	Sirine Balti	Tunisia	3.90	q
6	Kate Dennison	United Kingdom	3.80	q
7	Ana Rebenaque	Spain	3.80	
8	Miina Kenttä	Finland	3.70	
9	Julene Bailey	United States	3.70	
10	Amélie Delzenne	France	3.60	
11	Erin Boxall	Australia	3.40	

== Participation ==
According to an unofficial count, 23 athletes from 17 countries participated in the event.

- Australia (2)
- Brazil (1)
- Czech Republic (1)
- Finland (1)
- France (1)
- Germany (2)
- Greece (1)
- Israel (1)
- Poland (2)
- Portugal (1)
- Russia (2)
- South Africa (1)
- Spain (2)
- Tunisia (1)
- Ukraine (1)
- United Kingdom (1)
- United States (2)
