= 2014 IAAF World Indoor Championships – Women's pole vault =

The women's Pole Vault at the 2014 IAAF World Indoor Championships took place on 9 March 2014.

== Medalists ==
Gold	Silver	
Yarisley Silva; Cuba	Anzhelika Sidorova; Russia	Jiřina Svobodová; Czech Republic

== Records ==
Standing records prior to the 2014 IAAF World Indoor Championships
World record	Jennifer Suhr (USA)	5.02	Albuquerque, United States	2 March 2013
Championship record	Yelena Isinbayeva (RUS)	4.86	Budapest, Hungary	6 March 2004
World Leading	Anna Rogowska (POL)	4.76	Ghent, Belgium	9 February 2014
African record	Elmarie Gerryts (RSA)	4.41	Birmingham, Great Britain	20 February 2000
Asian record	Li Ling (CHN)	4.51	Hangzhou, China	19 February 2012
European record	Yelena Isinbayeva (RUS)	5.01	Stockholm, Sweden	23 February 2012
North and Central American and Caribbean record	Jenn Suhr (USA)	5.02	Albuquerque, United States	2 March 2013
Oceanian Record	Kym Howe (AUS)	4.72	Donetsk, Ukraine	10 February 2007
South American record	Fabiana Murer (BRA)	4.82	Birmingham, Great Britain	20 February 2010

== Qualification standards ==
Indoor	Outdoor
4.71

== Schedule ==
Date	Time	Round
9 March 2012	15:00	Final

== Results ==
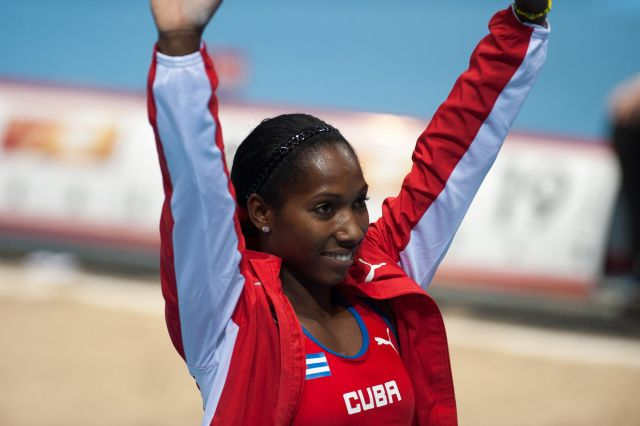
Yarisley Silva, the winner of the event.

Rank	Name	Nationality	4.30	4.45	4.55	4.65	4.70	4.75	Result	Notes
1st place, gold medalist(s)	Yarisley Silva	Cuba	–	o	o	xo	o	xxx	4.70	SB
2nd place, silver medalist(s)	Anzhelika Sidorova	Russia	o	o	o	o	xo	xxx	4.70	
2nd place, silver medalist(s)	Jiřina Svobodová	Czech Republic	–	o	o	o	xo	xxx	4.70	
4	Fabiana Murer	Brazil	–	o	o	o	xxo	xxx	4.70	SB
5	Anna Rogowska	Poland	–	o	o	o	xxx		4.65	
5	Jennifer Suhr	United States	–	–	–	o	–	xxx	4.65	
7	Silke Spiegelburg	Germany	–	xo	o	o	xxx		4.65	
8	Mary Saxer	United States	–	o	o	xxx			4.55	
9	Holly Bleasdale	Great Britain	–	xxo	o	xxx			4.55	
10	Tina Šutej	Slovenia	o	o	xxo	xxx			4.55	
11	Anastasia Savchenko	Russia	xo	o	xxx				4.45	
12	Nikoleta Kyriakopoulou	Greece	o	–	xxx				4.30	
