= Anna Giordano Bruno =

Italian pole vaulter (born 1980)

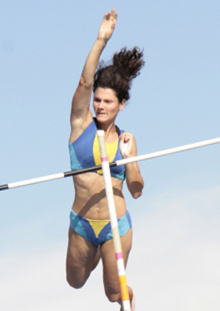

Personal information
- Nationality: Italian
- Born: 13 December 1980 (age 45) San Vito al Tagliamento, Italy
- Height: 1.71 m (5 ft 7 1/2 in)
- Weight: 63 kg (139 lb)

Sport
- Country: Italy
- Sport: Athletics
- Event: Pole vault
- Club: Assindustria Sport Padova

Achievements and titles
- Personal best: Pole vault: 4.60 (2009)
Medal record
Event	1st	2nd	3rd
Mediterranean Games	0	0	1

Anna Giordano Bruno (born 13 December 1980) is a retired Italian track and field athlete who specialised in the pole vault.

She won the bronze medal at the 2009 Mediterranean Games and represented Italy at the 2009 World Championships in Athletics. She has also competed at European-level both indoors and outdoors. She was a double Italian record holder in the event with an outdoor best of 4.60 metres and an indoor best of 4.50 m until 17 February 2013.

== Biography ==
Born in San Vito al Tagliamento, Giordano Bruno grew up in northern city of Trieste. She first cleared the height of 4.00 metres in 2002 but her progress stagnated over the following two years. She graduated from the University of Udine with a degree in mathematics in 2004 and went on to become a Research Fellow at the University of Padua.

She graduated from the University of Udine with a degree in mathematics in 2004, and she got a PhD in Mathematics at the University of Udine in 2008. Then she went on to become a Research Fellow at the University of Padua. From May 2011 she is a Researcher in Algebra at the University of Udine.

After changing her athletics coach to work with Slovenian Igor Lapajne in 2005, she began to improve and became the Italian indoor pole vault champion and attended the European Cup in 2006, where she finished fifth in the First League competition. She received an invitation to attend the 2006 European Athletics Championships and finished tenth in the qualifiers with a vault of 4.15 m. She had much improved her personal best mark over the course of 2006, resulting in an Italian record of 4.32 m in Busto Arsizio. After winning at the Italian indoor championships, she gained her first outdoor national title in 2007. Giordano Bruno retained her indoor title for a third victory in 2008 and repeated the feat outdoors. While she did not attend any major championships during this period, she improved her personal bests and had an outdoor mark of 4.41 m and an indoor mark of 4.25 m.

The 2009 season saw her reach new heights: she cleared 4.40 m indoors in Udine in February and equalled that mark to qualify for the final of the 2009 European Athletics Indoor Championships in Turin. However, in the final she finished last, having failed to clear a height in three attempts. She finished ninth in the women's pole vault at the 2009 European Team Championships but went on to win the bronze medal at the 2009 Mediterranean Games in Pescara with a vault of 4.35 m, her first medal a major international competition. She qualified to represent Italy for the 2009 World Championships in Athletics and just missed out on making the final, recording a mark of 4.50 m and losing out to Kristina Gadschiew on count-back. Nevertheless, she had set five Italian records over the year, which she ended with a personal best of 4.60 m.

At the start of 2010 she improved her indoor record to 4.50 m in Udine, but she missed out on the 2010 IAAF World Indoor Championships as her compatriot Elena Scarpellini was selected instead. She retired at the end of 2012.

== Personal bests ==
Event	Best (m)	Venue	Date
Pole vault (outdoor)	4.60	Milan, Italy	2 August 2009
Pole vault (indoor)	4.50	Udine, Italy	6 February 2010

- All information taken from IAAF profile.

== Achievements ==
Year	Competition	Venue	Position	Notes
2006	European Cup	Prague, Czech Republic	5th	3.90 m
2006	European Championships	Gothenburg, Sweden	20th	4.15 m
2009	European Indoor Championships	Turin, Italy	8th	NM
2009	European Team Championships	Leiria, Portugal	9th	4.25 m
2009	Mediterranean Games	Pescara, Italy	3rd	4,30 m
2009	World Championships	Berlin, Germany	13th	4.50 m
2011	World Championships	Daegu, South Korea	22nd	4.40 m

== See also ==
- Italian all-time lists - Pole vault
