= Joanna Piwowarska =

Polish pole vaulter

Joanna Pilichiewicz/Piwowarska
Personal information
- Full name: Joanna Aleksandra; Pilichiewicz/Piwowarska
- Nationality: Poland
- Born: 4 November 1983 (age 42) Wałcz, Poland
- Height: 1.72 m (5 ft 7 1/2 in)
- Weight: 56 kg (123 lb)

Sport
- Sport: Athletics
- Event: Pole vault
- Club: AZS Warszawa
- Coached by: Andrzej Krzesinski !!!

Achievements and titles
- Personal best: Pole vault: 4.53 m (2006)

Joanna Aleksandra Pilichiewicz/Piwowarska (born November 4, 1983, in Wałcz) is a Polish pole vaulter. She set her personal best height of 4.53 metres by finishing second for the women's pole vault at the 2006 IAAF Super Grand Prix Meeting in Doha, Qatar.

Pilichiewicz/Piwowarska represented Poland at the 2008 Summer Olympics in Beijing, where she competed for the women's pole vault, along with her compatriots Monika Pyrek and Olympic bronze medalist Anna Rogowska. She successfully cleared a height of 4.30 metres in the qualifying rounds, finishing nineteenth overall, and tying her position with Greece's Afroditi Skafida and Portugal's Sandra-Helena Tavares.

== Competition record ==
Year	Competition	Venue	Position	Notes
Representing Poland
1999	World Youth Championships	Bydgoszcz, Poland	15th (q)	3.20 m
2001	European Junior Championships	Grosseto, Italy	–	NM
2002	World Junior Championships	Kingston, Jamaica	14th (q)	3.80 m
2006	European Championships	Gothenburg, Sweden	12th (q)	4.30 m
2007	European Indoor Championships	Birmingham, United Kingdom	9th (q)	4.50 m
2008	Olympic Games	Beijing, China	19th (q)	4.30 m
2009	European Indoor Championships	Turin, Italy	7th	4.35 m
2009	Universiade	Belgrade, Serbia	4th	4.45 m
2009	World Championships	Berlin, Germany	22nd (q)	4.25 m
2011	Universiade	Shenzhen, China	5th	4.35 m
