= Kristina Gadschiew =

German pole vaulter (born 1984)

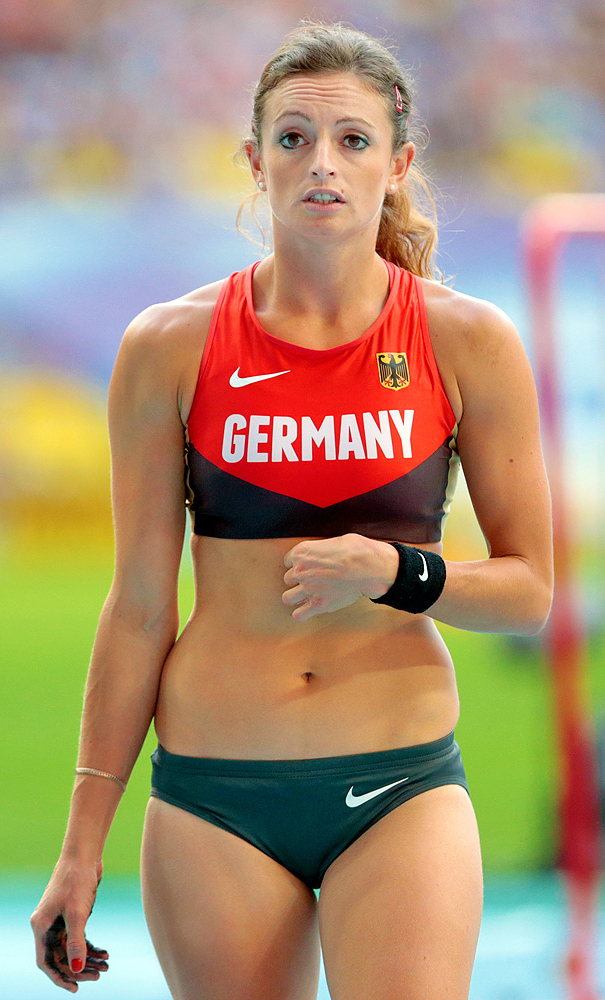
- Kristina Gadschiew at the 2013 World Championships in Athletics

Medal record

Women's athletics

Representing Germany

European Indoor Championships
Bronze medal – third place	2011 Paris	Pole vault

Universiade
Silver medal – second place	2007 Bangkok	Pole vault
Bronze medal – third place	2009 Belgrade	Pole vault

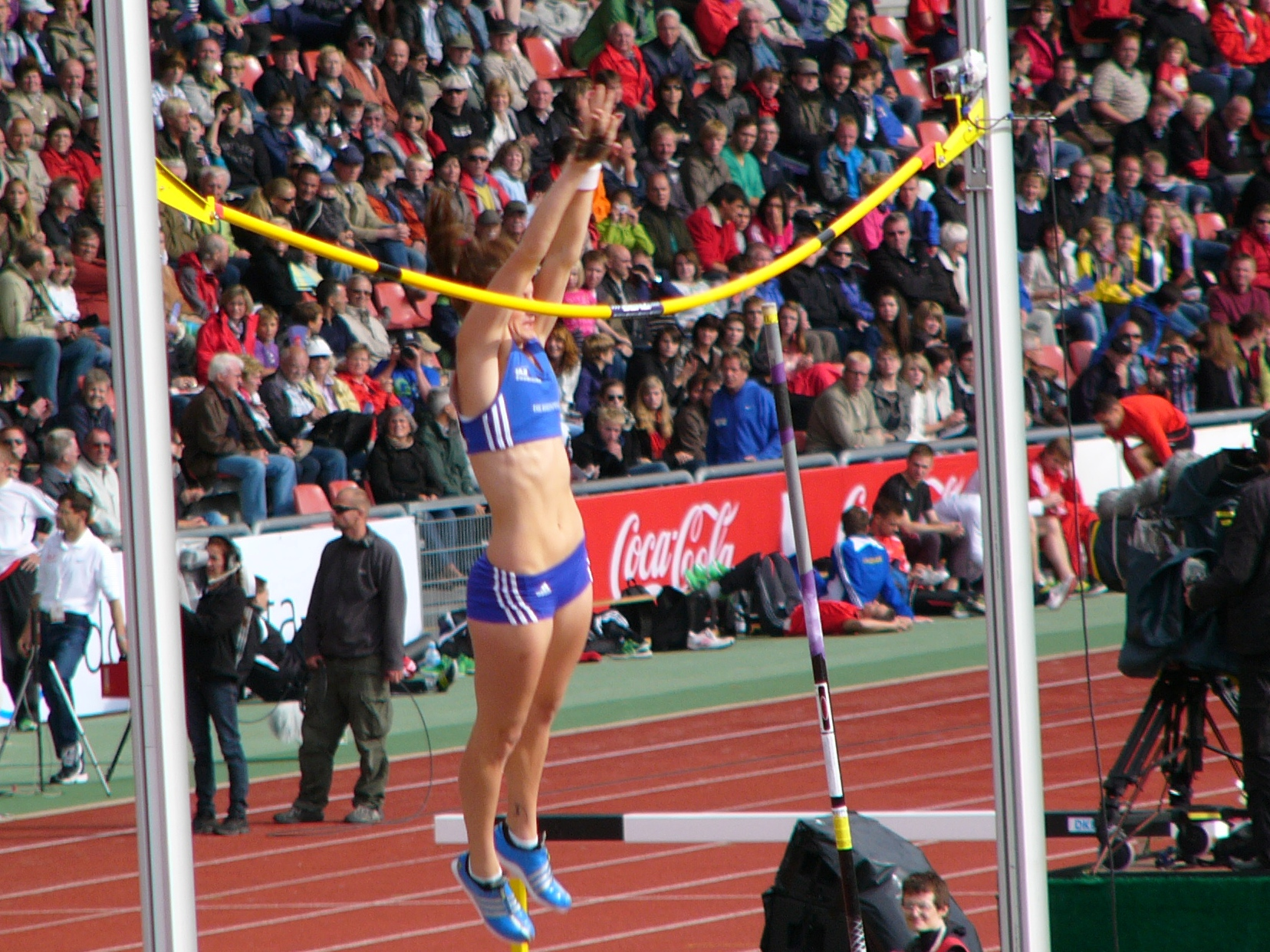

Kristina Gadschiew (born 3 July 1984) is a German pole vaulter who has competed at the World Championship-level. She has also reached the podium at the Summer Universiade on two occasions – 2007 and 2009. She has a personal best vault of 4.66 m indoor. Gadschiew represents the sports club LAZ Zweibrücken.

== Biography ==
Born in Vassilyevka, Saratov Oblast, Soviet Union, she moved to Germany as a child (as the other pole vaulter Lisa Ryzih). She started competing in pole vault competitions as a teenager and was third in the German cup in athletics in 1999. She failed to build upon this early success and her athletics career stalled. A switch to train with Andrei Tivontchik gave impetus for greater performances and she re-emerged in 2005. She cleared over four metres for the first time and improved her best to 4.35 m in 2006. She began studying chemistry and sports at the Kaiserslautern University of Technology. The 2007 Summer Universiade provided her with her first international competition and she took the silver medal with a personal best clearance of 4.40 m, finishing as runner-up by count-back behind Aleksandra Kiryashova. She became the German university champion in 2008 and was fourth at the German senior championships later that year.

A personal best vault of 4.50 m at the 2009 German Indoor Championships in Leipzig earned her a place on the German team for the 2009 European Athletics Indoor Championships. She finished in fifth place behind her teammates, Silke Spiegelburg and Anna Battke, who both set personal bests. A second-place finish at the German Outdoor Championships entitled her to her first World Championships appearance. She retained her university title and recorded 4.50 m for the bronze medal at the 2009 Summer Universiade. A few weeks later she made her first appearance on the major European circuit, and set a new best of 4.58 m for third at the London Grand Prix, beaten only by Yelena Isinbayeva and Anna Rogowska.

She scraped through the qualifiers of the 2009 World Championships, but did not perform as well in the pole vault final, taking three attempts to clear 4.40 m and finishing in tenth place. She set a new indoor best of 4.60 m in February the following year and competed at the 2010 IAAF World Indoor Championships, reaching the final and finishing seventh overall. In late June she set an outdoor best of 4.60 m to win in Reims on the Alma Athlé Tour.

== Personal bests ==
Event	Best (m)	Venue	Date
Pole vault (outdoor)	4.60	Reims, France	30 June 2010
Pole vault (indoor)	4.66	Potsdam, Germany	18 February 2011

- All information taken from IAAF profile.

== Competition record ==
Year	Competition	Venue	Position	Notes
2007	Universiade	Bangkok, Thailand	2nd	4.40 m
2009	European Indoor Championships	Turin, Italy	5th	4.35 m
2009	Universiade	Belgrade, Serbia	3rd	4.50 m
2009	World Championships	Berlin, Germany	10th	4.40 m
2010	World Indoor Championships	Doha, Qatar	7th	4.40 m
2011	European Indoor Championships	Paris, France	3rd	4.65 m
2011	World Championships	Daegu, South Korea	10th	4.55 m
2012	World Indoor Championships	Istanbul, Turkey	12th	4.30 m
2013	European Indoor Championship	Gothenburg, Sweden	7th	4.37 m
2013	World Championships	Moscow, Russia	10th	4.45 m

== See also ==
- Germany all-time top lists - Pole vault
