= Athletics at the 2008 Summer Olympics – Women's pole vault =

Women's pole vault at the Games of the XXIX Olympiad
- Venue: Beijing National Stadium
- Dates: 16 August 2008 (qualification); 18 August 2008 (final)
- Competitors: 36 from 24 nations
- Winning height: 5.05 m WR

Medalists
1st place, gold medalist(s)		Yelena Isinbayeva	Russia
2nd place, silver medalist(s)		Jennifer Stuczynski	United States
3rd place, bronze medalist(s)		Svetlana Feofanova	Russia

Official Video Highlights

The women's pole vault at the 2008 Summer Olympics took place between August 16 and 18 at the Beijing National Stadium.

The qualifying standards were 4.45 m (A standard) and 4.30 m (B standard).

The final was won by 25 cm by Yelena Isinbayeva, who set a new world record height of 5.05 meters for the discipline. As of 2023, this winning margin remains unmatched.

During the finals, one of the poles which Brazilian Fabiana Murer would use disappeared, causing her to spend 10–15 minutes trying to get it back. The lost time and having to use another pole led her to bad results. Murer complained about the organization, and would only return to China 7 years later at the 2015 World Championships in Athletics, this time winning a silver medal.

== Records ==
Prior to this competition, the existing world and Olympic records were as follows:

World record	Yelena Isinbayeva (RUS)	5.04	Monaco, Monaco	29 July 2008
Olympic record	Yelena Isinbayeva (RUS)	4.91	Athens, Greece	24 August 2004

The following new world and Olympic records were set during this competition.

Date	Event	Name	Nationality	Height	Notes
18 August	Final	Yelena Isinbayeva	Russia	5.05	WR

== Results ==
Key

- o = Height cleared
- x = Height failed
- – = Height passed
- r = Retired
- SB = Season's best
- PB = Personal best
- NR = National record
- AR = Area record
- OR = Olympic record
- WR = World record
- WL = World lead
- NM = No mark
- DNS = Did not start
- DQ = Disqualified

=== Qualifying round ===
Qualifying performance: 4.60 (Q) or at least 12 best performers (q) advance to the final.

Rank	Group	Name	Nationality	4.00	4.15	4.30	4.40	4.50	4.60	Result	Notes
1	A	Yelena Isinbayeva	Russia	–	–	–	–	–	o	4.60	Q
2	B	Vanessa Boslak	France	–	o	o	o	o	–	4.50	q, =SB
2	A	Gao Shuying	China	–	–	o	o	o	–	4.50	q
2	B	Fabiana Murer	Brazil	–	–	–	o	o	–	4.50	q
2	B	Jennifer Stuczynski	United States	–	–	–	–	o	–	4.50	q
6	A	Svetlana Feofanova	Russia	–	–	–	xo	o	–	4.50	q
6	A	April Steiner Bennett	United States	–	–	xo	o	o	–	4.50	q
8	A	Monika Pyrek	Poland	–	–	–	o	xo	–	4.50	q
8	B	Anna Rogowska	Poland	–	–	–	o	xo	–	4.50	q
10	B	Yuliya Golubchikova	Russia	–	–	o	xo	xo	–	4.50	q
10	A	Carolin Hingst	Germany	–	o	xo	o	xo	–	4.50	q
12	B	Silke Spiegelburg	Germany	–	–	xxo	o	xo	–	4.50	q
13	A	Naroa Agirre	Spain	o	o	o	xo	xxx		4.40	=SB
14	A	Anastasija Reiberger	Germany	–	o	xo	xo	xxx		4.40	
15	B	Kate Dennison	Great Britain	xo	xo	xo	xxo	xxx		4.40	=PB
16	B	Alana Boyd	Australia	–	–	o	xxx			4.30	
16	B	Roslinda Samsu	Malaysia	o	o	o	xxx			4.30	=SB
18	B	Kelsie Hendry	Canada	–	–	xo	xxx			4.30	
19	A	Joanna Piwowarska	Poland	xo	o	xo	xxx			4.30	
19	A	Afrodíti Skafída	Greece	–	xo	xo	xxx			4.30	
19	A	Sandra-Helena Tavares	Portugal	o	xo	xo	xxx			4.30	
22	B	Nicole Büchler	Switzerland	xxo	o	xxo	xxx			4.30	
23	A	Marion Buisson	France	o	o	xx				4.15	
23	B	Thórey Edda Elisdóttir	Iceland	–	o	xxx				4.15	
25	B	Zhou Yang	China	xo	o	xxx				4.15	
26	B	Krisztina Molnár	Hungary	xxo	o	xxx				4.15	
27	A	Natalya Kushch	Ukraine	–	xxo	–	xxx			4.15	
27	B	Nikoléta Kiriakopoúlou	Greece	–	xxo	xxx				4.15	
27	A	Li Ling	China	–	xxo	xxx				4.15	
27	A	Yarisley Silva	Cuba	–	xxo	xxx				4.15	
31	A	Alejandra García	Argentina	xxo	xxo	xxx				4.15	
32	A	Leila Ben Youssef	Tunisia	xo	xxx					4.00	
32	A	Vanessa Vandy	Finland	xo	xxx					4.00	
34	B	Anna Fitídou	Cyprus	xxo	xxx					4.00	
	B	Kateřina Baďurová	Czech Republic	xxx						NM	
	B	Erica Bartolina	United States	–	–	xxx				NM	

WR – World Record / =SB – Equal Season Best / PB – Personal Best / SB – Season Best

=== Final ===
The final was held on August 18.

Rank	Name	Nationality	4.30	4.45	4.55	4.65	4.70	4.75	4.80	4.85	4.90	4.95	5.00	5.05	Result	Notes
1st place, gold medalist(s)	Yelena Isinbayeva	Russia	–	–	–	–	o	–	–	o	–	xxo	–	xxo	5.05	WR
2nd place, silver medalist(s)	Jennifer Stuczynski	United States	–	–	o	–	o	xo	o	–	xxx				4.80	
3rd place, bronze medalist(s)	Svetlana Feofanova	Russia	–	o	o	xo	–	o	xxx						4.75	SB
4	Yulia Golubchikova	Russia	–	o	o	xo	o	xo	xxx						4.75	PB
5	Monika Pyrek	Poland	–	o	o	o	xo	xxx							4.70	
6	Carolin Hingst	Germany	o	o	o	xxo	xxx								4.65	SB
7	Silke Spiegelburg	Germany	o	xo	o	xxo	xxx								4.65	
8	April Steiner Bennett	United States	o	o	o	xxx									4.55	
9	Vanessa Boslak	France	o	o	xo	xxx									4.55	SB
10	Fabiana Murer	Brazil	–	o	–	xxx									4.45	
10	Anna Rogowska	Poland	–	o	xxx										4.45	
12	Gao Shuying	China	o	xxo	xxx										4.45	

WR – World Record / =SB – Equal Season Best / PB – Personal Best / SB – Season Best
