= Erica Bartolina =

American pole vaulter

Personal information
- Full name: Erica (Boren) Bartolina Fraley
- Nationality: United States
- Born: May 15, 1980 (age 46) Corvallis, Oregon, U.S.
- Home town: Hammond, Louisiana, U.S.
- Height: 5 ft 6 in (168 cm)
- Weight: 126 lb (57 kg)

Sport
- Sport: Athletics
- Event: Pole vault
- College team: Texas A&M Aggies
- Coached by: Mike Bartolina

Achievements and titles
- Personal bests: Outdoor: 4.55 m (2008); Indoor: 4.40 m (2007)

Erica Bartolina (née Boren; born May 15, 1980, in Corvallis, Oregon) is an American pole vaulter. She set a personal best of 4.55 m by placing third at the 2008 U.S. Olympic Trials in Eugene, Oregon, which guaranteed her a qualifying place for the Olympics.

== Career ==
Bartolina grew up on a sheep farm in Corvallis, Oregon. She lost her eyesight as a baby in a car accident, when a pair of scissors swiped across the dashboard during the collision, causing the injury and limiting her depth perception for life. Despite being blind in one eye, Bartolina did not stop her dream of becoming an Olympic athlete. She started her athletic career as a cross-country runner at age fourteen, until she was advised by her high school track coach Joe Fulton to try out for pole vault. Since then, Bartolina developed into one of the top pole vaulters in the state, and earned a full scholarship at Texas A&M University in College Station, Texas, where she won two Big 12 Conference titles, and also, held the distinction of being one of the school's first female pole vaulters.

Bartolina improved her marks in pole vault, when she finished ninth at the U.S. Olympic Trials in 2004, and fourth at the U.S. Indoor Championships in 2005. Shortly after the championships, Bartolina took a year off from pole vault, when she suffered a severe back injury from training at Texas A&M University. In 2008, she came out of recovery from injury, and competed at the U.S. Olympic Trials in Eugene, Oregon, where she successfully cleared a height and set a personal best of 4.55 metres in the women's pole vault. Finishing third from the trials and reaching an A-standard height of 4.45 metres, Bartolina automatically qualified for the Olympics.

At the 2008 Summer Olympics in Beijing, Bartolina competed as a member of the U.S. track and field team in the women's pole vault, along with her teammates April Steiner Bennett, and Jennifer Stuczynski, who eventually won the silver medal in the final. Unfortunately, she failed to clear a height of 4.30 metres in the preliminary rounds, after three unsuccessive attempts.

Bartolina currently resides in Hammond, Louisiana and is the owner of "The Louisiana Pole Vault Compound", a pole vault training facility. She coached high school athlete Devin King to a personal best height of 5.50 m (18 ft 1 in) at the 2014 World Junior Championships, and the high school indoor record of 5.45 m (17 ft 11 in). In 2014, Bartolina married Doug Fraley, coach and former pole vaulter.
