= Athletics at the 2007 Summer Universiade – Women's pole vault =

The women's pole vault event at the 2007 Summer Universiade was held on 9–10 August.

== Medalists ==
Gold	Silver	Bronze
Aleksandra Kiryashova; Russia	Kristina Gadschiew; Germany	Nicole Büchler; Switzerland

== Results ==
=== Qualification ===
Rank	Group	Athlete	Nationality	Result	Notes
1	A	Aleksandra Kiryashova	Russia	4.10	q
2	A	Floé Kühnert	Germany	4.00	q
2	A	Sandra Tavares	Portugal	4.00	q
2	A	Zhou Yang	China	4.00	q
5	A	Nicole Büchler	Switzerland	4.00	q
5	A	Kelsie Hendry	Canada	4.00	q
5	A	Roslinda Samsu	Malaysia	4.00	q
8	A	Dimitra Emmanouil	Greece	4.00	q
9	A	Eleonor Tavares	Portugal	3.90	
10	A	Anita Tørring	Denmark	3.90	SB
11	A	Kathleen Ong	Malaysia	3.40	
1	B	Slavica Semenjuk	Serbia	4.10	q
2	B	Kristina Gadschiew	Germany	4.00	q
3	B	Joana Costa	Brazil	4.00	q
4	B	Charmaine Lucock	Australia	4.00	q
5	B	Nikoleta Kyriakopoulou	Greece	3.90	
6	B	Marion Buisson	France	3.90	
7	B	Paulina Dębska	Poland	3.90	
8	B	Nisrine Dinar	Morocco	3.80	
9	B	Sunisa Kao-Iad	Thailand	3.60	
10	B	Kristina Ulitina	Estonia	3.40	
10	B	Pasuta Wongwieng	Thailand	3.40	
	B	Amélie Delzenne	France	NM	

=== Final ===
Rank	Athlete	Nationality	3.80	4.00	4.10	4.15	4.20	4.25	4.30	4.35	4.40	4.45	4.55	Result	Notes
1st place, gold medalist(s)	Aleksandra Kiryashova	Russia	–	–	o	–	o	–	o	–	o	–	xxx	4.40	
2nd place, silver medalist(s)	Kristina Gadschiew	Germany	–	xo	–	xo	–	o	xxo	–	xo	xxx		4.40	
3rd place, bronze medalist(s)	Nicole Büchler	Switzerland	xxo	xo	–	xo	–	o	–	xxo	xxx			4.35	PB
4	Kelsie Hendry	Canada	–	–	xo	–	o	–	o	–	xxx			4.30	
5	Roslinda Samsu	Malaysia	–	–	o	–	xo	xxx						4.20	
6	Dimitra Emmanouil	Greece	o	o	o	o	xxo	xxx						4.20	SB
7	Floé Kühnert	Germany	–	–	–	o	–	–	xxx					4.15	
8	Zhou Yang	China	xo	o	xxo	o	xxx							4.15	
9	Joana Costa	Brazil	o	o	o	xo	xxx							4.15	
10	Slavica Semenjuk	Serbia	o	o	o	–	xxx							4.10	
11	Sandra Tavares	Portugal	xo	o	xo	–	xxx							4.10	
	Charmaine Lucock	Australia	–	xxx										NM	
