= Nicole Büchler =

Swiss pole vaulter

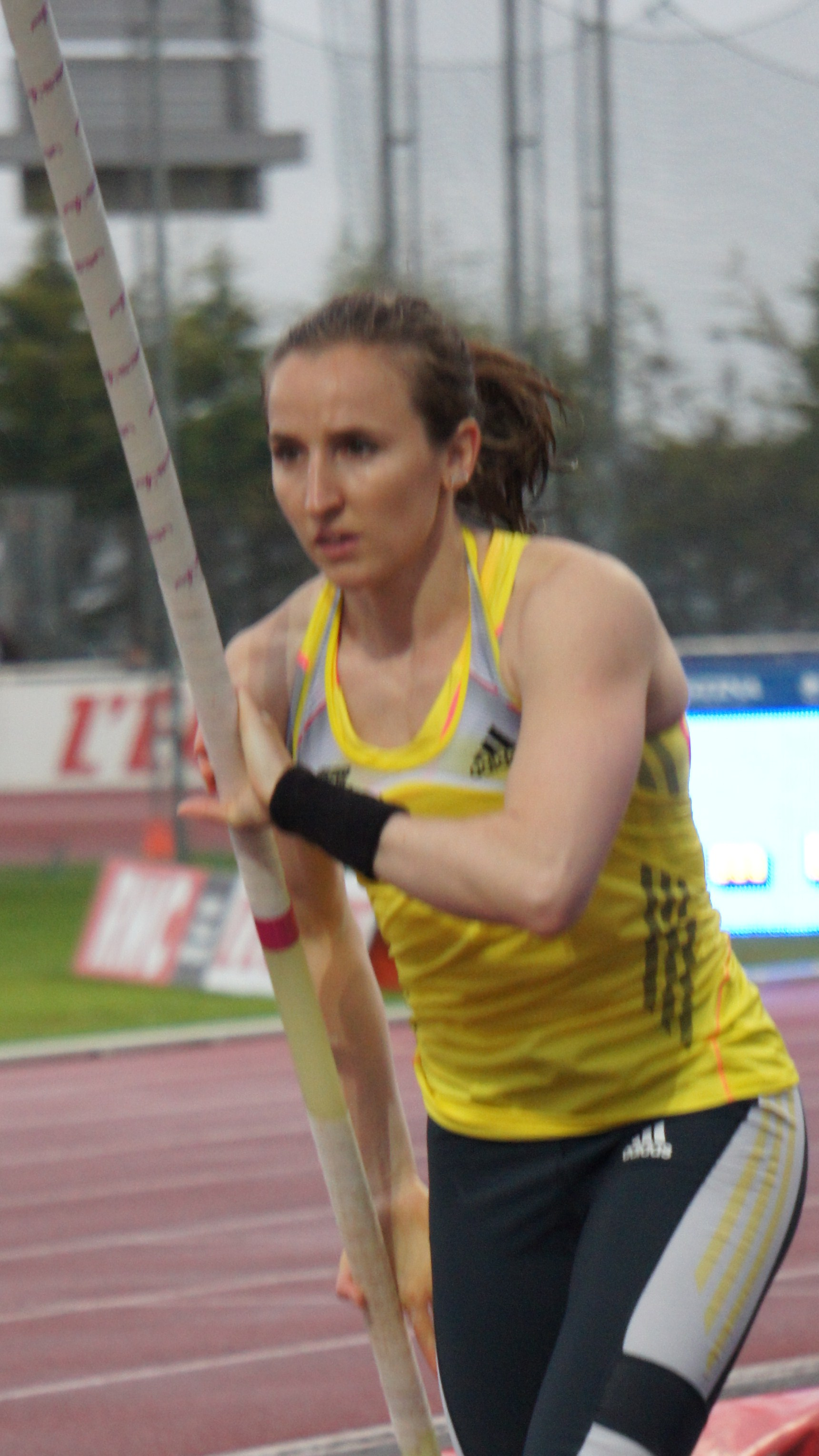

Personal information
- Born: 17 December 1983 (age 42)
- Height: 1.62 m (5 ft 4 in)
- Weight: 55 kg (121 lb)

Sport
- Country: Switzerland
- Sport: Athletics
- Event: Pole Vault
- Updated on 6 August 2012

Nicole Büchler (born 17 December 1983) is a Swiss former pole vaulter.

== Achievements ==
Year	Competition	Venue	Position	Notes
Representing Switzerland
2005	European U23 Championships	Erfurt, Germany	12th	3.80 m
2005	Universiade	İzmir, Turkey	18th (q)	3.80 m
2007	Universiade	Bangkok, Thailand	3rd	4.35 m
2008	Olympic Games	Beijing, China	22nd (q)	4.30 m
2009	European Indoor Championships	Turin, Italy	15th (q)	4.25 m
2009	Universiade	Belgrade, Serbia	2nd	4.50 m
2009	World Championships	Berlin, Germany	15th (q)	4.50 m
2011	World Championships	Daegu, South Korea	16th (q)	4.50 m
2012	World Indoor Championships	Istanbul, Turkey	8th	4.55 m
2012	European Championships	Helsinki, Finland	–	NM
2012	Olympic Games	London, United Kingdom	25th (q)	4.25 m
2013	World Championships	Moscow, Russia	15th (q)	4.45 m
2014	European Championships	Zurich, Switzerland	17th (q)	4.25 m
2015	European Indoor Championships	Prague, Czech Republic	11th (q)	4.45 m
2015	World Championships	Beijing, China	17th (q)	4.45 m
2016	World Indoor Championships	Portland, United States	4th	4.80 m
2016	Olympic Games	Rio de Janeiro, Brazil	6th	4.70 m
2017	World Championships	London, United Kingdom	11th	4.45 m
2019	World Championships	Doha, Qatar	18th (q)	4.55 m
