= Athletics at the 2009 Summer Universiade – Women's pole vault =

The women's pole vault event at the 2009 Summer Universiade was held on 8–10 July.

== Medalists ==
| Gold | Silver | Bronze |
|---|---|---|
| Jiřina Ptáčníková; Czech Republic | Nicole Büchler; Switzerland | Kristina Gadschiew; Germany |

== Results ==
=== Qualification ===
Qualification: 4.10 m (Q) or at least 12 best (q) qualified for the final.

| Rank | Group | Athlete | Nationality | 3.60 | 3.80 | 3.90 | 4.00 | 4.10 | Result | Notes |
|---|---|---|---|---|---|---|---|---|---|---|
| 1 | A | Gabriella Duclos-Lasnier | Canada | – | - | – | o | o | 4.10 | Q |
| 1 | B | Li Ling | China | – | - | – | o | o | 4.10 | Q |
| 1 | B | Joanna Piwowarska | Poland | – | - | – | – | o | 4.10 | Q |
| 1 | B | Jiřina Ptáčníková | Czech Republic | – | - | – | – | o | 4.10 | Q |
| 5 | B | Amanda Bisk | Australia | – | o | o | xo | o | 4.10 | Q |
| 6 | B | Denise von Eynatten | Germany | – | – | – | xxo | o | 4.10 | Q |
| 7 | A | Nicole Büchler | Switzerland | – | – | – | o | xo | 4.10 | Q |
| 7 | A | Kristina Gadschiew | Germany | – | – | – | – | xo | 4.10 | Q |
| 9 | B | Jelena Radinović Vasić | Serbia | – | xxo | – | xo | xo | 4.10 | Q |
| 10 | B | Télie Mathiot | France | – | xxo | – | o | xxo | 4.10 | Q |
| 11 | A | Enikö Erös | Hungary | – | – | o | o | xxx | 4.00 | q |
| 11 | A | Tina Šutej | Slovenia | – | o | o | o | xxx | 4.00 | q |
| 13 | A | Choi Yun-hee | South Korea | – | o | o | xo | xxx | 4.00 | |
| 14 | B | Mateja Drobnič | Slovenia | o | xxx | | | | 3.60 | |
| | A | Yang Rachel Isabel | Singapore | xxx | | | | | NM | |

=== Final ===
| Rank | Athlete | Nationality | 3.80 | 3.90 | 4.00 | 4.10 | 4.20 | 4.25 | 4.30 | 4.35 | 4.40 | 4.45 | 4.50 | 4.55 | 4.60 | Result | Notes |
|---|---|---|---|---|---|---|---|---|---|---|---|---|---|---|---|---|---|
| 1st place, gold medalist(s) | Jiřina Ptáčníková | Czech Republic | – | – | - | – | o | – | - | xo | - | xo | xo | o | xxx | 4.55 | PB |
| 2nd place, silver medalist(s) | Nicole Büchler | Switzerland | – | – | - | o | o | – | xo | xo | o | o | o | x– | xx | 4.50 | PB |
| 3rd place, bronze medalist(s) | Kristina Gadschiew | Germany | – | – | - | - | o | – | xo | o | o | x- | xo | x– | xx | 4.50 | |
| 4 | Joanna Piwowarska | Poland | – | – | - | o | o | – | o | - | xo | o | xxx | | | 4.45 | |
| 5 | Gabriella Duclos-Lasnier | Canada | – | – | - | xxo | o | xo | xo | xxx | | | | | | 4.30 | PB |
| 6 | Li Ling | China | – | – | - | xxo | - | - | xxo | xxx | | | | | | 4.30 | |
| 7 | Tina Šutej | Slovenia | o | – | o | xo | xo | xxo | xxx | | | | | | | 4.25 | SB |
| 8 | Denise von Eynatten | Germany | – | – | xo | xo | o | xxx | | | | | | | | 4.20 | |
| 9 | Amanda Bisk | Australia | o | – | o | o | xxo | xxx | | | | | | | | 4.20 | |
| 10 | Enikö Erös | Hungary | – | – | xo | o | xxx | | | | | | | | | 4.10 | |
| 11 | Jelena Radinović Vasić | Serbia | o | – | xo | xxo | xxx | | | | | | | | | 4.10 | |
| 12 | Télie Mathiot | France | o | – | xo | – | xxx | | | | | | | | | 4.00 | |
