= Maria Leonor Tavares =

French-Portuguese pole vaulter

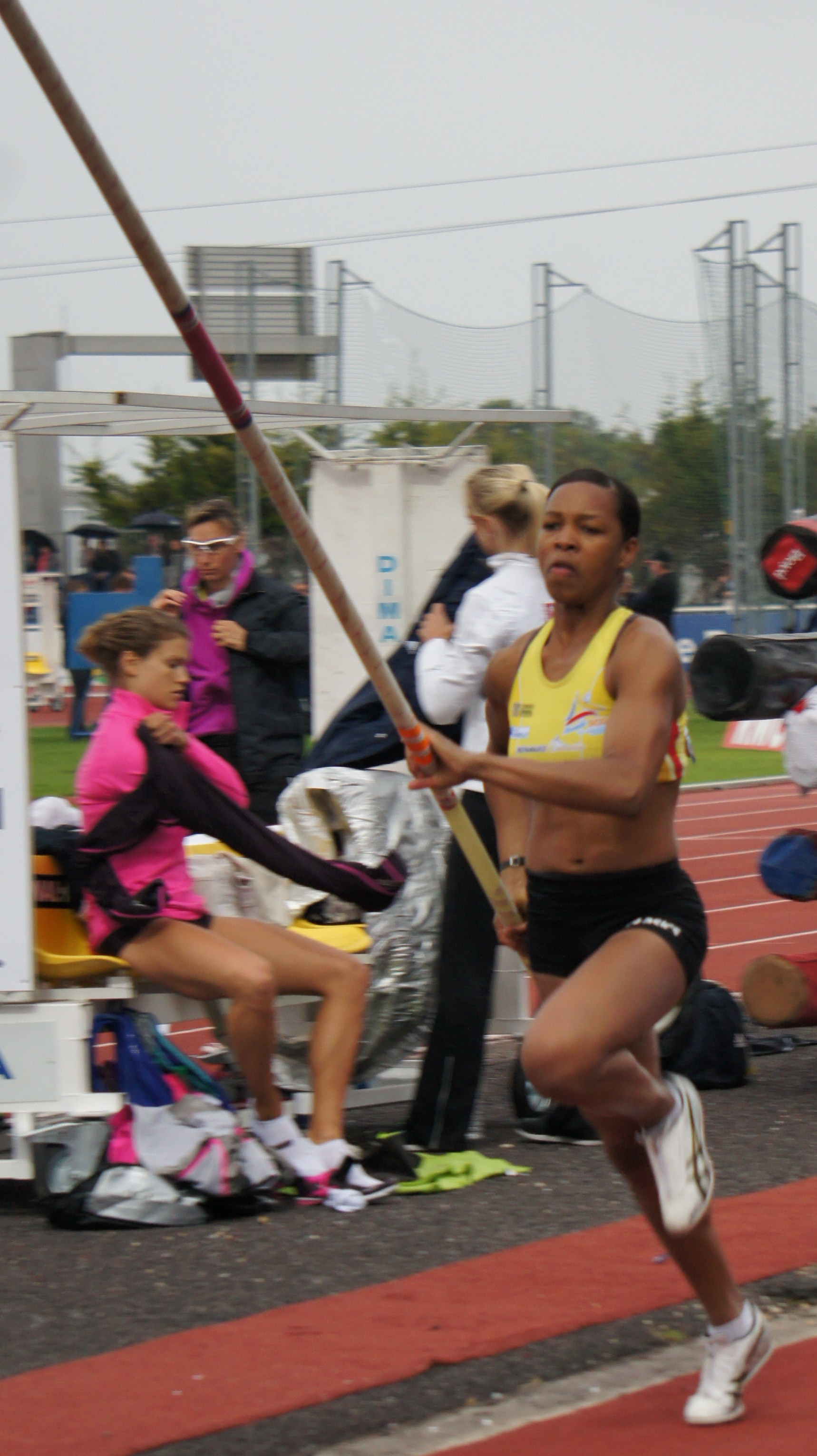

Personal information
- Born: September 24, 1985 (age 40) Paris, France
- Height: 1.65 m (5 ft 5 in)
- Weight: 55 kg (121 lb)

Sport
- Country: Portugal
- Sport: Athletics
- Event: Pole vault
- Updated on 15 August 2012

Maria Leonor Ribeiro Tavares, also known as Eleonor Tavares, (born 24 September 1985 in Paris, France) is a French-born Portuguese pole vaulter. She competed at the 2012 Summer Olympics.

Born in France to Portuguese parents of Cape Verdean descent, she has two older sisters who also compete in the pole vault, Sandra-Helena Homo and Elisabete Ansel.

Her personal bests in the event are 4.50 metres outdoors (Albi 2011) and 4.43 metres indoors (Aulnay-sous-Bois 2014). Both are current national records.

== Competition record ==
Year	Competition	Venue	Position	Notes
Representing Portugal
2002	World Junior Championships	Kingston, Jamaica	20th (q)	3.60 m
2007	European Indoor Championships	Birmingham, United Kingdom	21st (q)	3.75 m
2007	European U23 Championships	Debrecen, Hungary	13th (q)	3.95 m
2007	Universiade	Bangkok, Thailand	13th (q)	3.90 m
2009	European Indoor Championships	Turin, Italy	9th (q)	4.35 m
2010	European Championships	Barcelona, Spain	23rd (q)	4.05 m
2011	European Indoor Championships	Paris, France	18th (q)	4.15 m
2011	World Championships	Daegu, South Korea	18th (q)	4.25 m
2012	European Championships	Helsinki, Finland	17th (q)	4.25 m
2012	Olympic Games	London, United Kingdom	31st (q)	4.10 m
2014	European Championships	Zürich, Switzerland	26th (q)	4.00 m
2016	Olympic Games	Rio de Janeiro, Brazil	29th (q)	4.15 m
2018	Mediterranean Games	Tarragona, Spain	7th	4.11 m
