= Jiřina Kudličková =

Czech pole vaulter

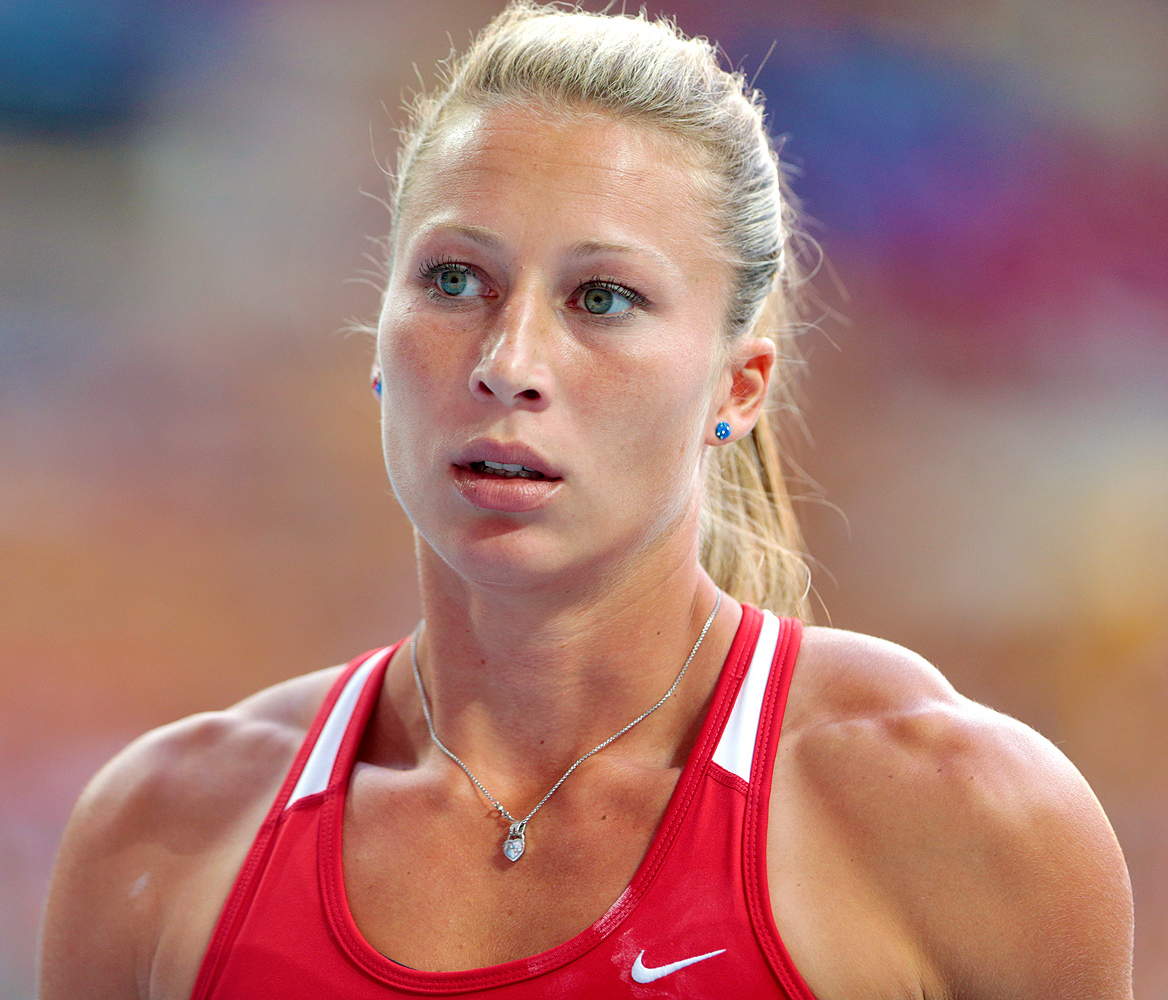
- Jiřina Ptáčníková at the 2013 World Championships in Athletics

Personal information
- Nationality: Czech
- Born: Jiřina Ptáčníková; 20 May 1986 (age 40) Plzeň, Czechoslovakia
- Height: 1.74 m (5 ft 9 in)
- Weight: 62 kg (137 lb)

Sport
- Country: Czech Republic
- Sport: Athletics
- Event: Pole vault
- Club: USK Praha
- Coached by: František Ptáčník, Pavel Sluka

Achievements and titles
- Personal best: Pole vault: 4.76 (2013)
Medal record
World Indoor Championships
Silver medal – second place	2014 Sopot	Pole vault
European Championships
Gold medal – first place	2012 Helsinki	Pole vault
European Team Championships
Bronze medal – third place	2011 Stockholm	Pole vault
Universiade
Gold medal – first place	2009 Belgrade	Pole vault

Jiřina Kudličková (formerly Svobodová, née Ptáčníková; Czech pronunciation: [ˈjɪr̝ɪna ˈptaːtʃɲiːkovaː]; born 20 May 1986) is a Czech former pole vaulter. She won the 2012 European Athletics Championships in Helsinki and the 2014 World Indoor Championships.

== Biography ==
She is the daughter of the Czech sprinter František Ptáčník.

Ptáčníková achieved a personal best (indoor) of 4.70 metres in Donetsk in 2012. This was a Czech record. She improved to 4.71 m in 2014, which was also a Czech record.

She also achieved outdoor personal best of 4.76 metres in Plzeň in September 2013.

== Personal life ==
On 21 September 2012 she married the hurdler Petr Svoboda, however the couple divorced in 2014. In September 2020 Ptáčníková married pole vaulter Jan Kudlička.

== International competitions ==
Year	Competition	Venue	Position	Notes
Representing the Czech Republic
2002	World Junior Championships	Kingston, Jamaica	12th (q)	3.80 m
2004	World Junior Championships	Grosseto, Italy	9th (q)	3.85 m
2006	European Championships	Gothenburg, Sweden	27th (q)	3.80 m
2009	European Indoor Championships	Turin, Italy	13th (q)	4.25 m
2009	Universiade	Belgrade, Serbia	1st	4.55 m
2009	World Championships	Berlin, Germany	16th (q)	4.40 m
2010	World Indoor Championships	Doha, Qatar	5th	4.60 m
2010	European Championships	Barcelona, Spain	5th	4.65 m
2011	European Indoor Championships	Paris, France	4th	4.60 m
2011	European Team Championships Super League	Stockholm, Sweden	3rd	4.60 m
2011	World Championships	Daegu, South Korea	7th	4.65 m
2012	World Indoor Championships	Istanbul, Turkey	6th	4.55 m
2012	European Championships	Helsinki, Finland	1st	4.60 m
2012	Olympic Games	London, United Kingdom	6th	4.45 m
2013	European Indoor Championships	Gothenburg, Sweden	4th	4.62 m
2013	World Championships	Moscow, Russia	8th	4.55 m
2014	European Championships	Zürich, Switzerland	6th	4.45 m
2014	World Indoor Championships	Sopot, Poland	2nd	4.70 m
2015	World Championships	Beijing, China	—	NM
2016	Olympic Games	Rio de Janeiro, Brazil	19th (q)	4.45 m
2017	World Championships	London, United Kingdom	18th (q)	4.35 m

== See also ==
- Czech Athletics Championships - Records
- Czech records in athletics
