= Sandra-Helena Tavares =

Portuguese pole vaulter

Personal information
- Full name: Sandra-Helena Ribeiro; Tavares
- Nationality: Portugal
- Born: 29 May 1982 (age 44)
- Height: 1.66 m (5 ft 5 1/2 in)
- Weight: 60 kg (132 lb)

Sport
- Sport: Athletics
- Event: Pole vault

Achievements and titles
- Personal best: Pole vault: 4.35 m (2009)

Sandra-Helena Ribeiro Tavares Homo (born 29 May 1982) is a Portuguese pole vaulter. Tavares represented Portugal at the 2008 Summer Olympics in Beijing, where she competed for the women's pole vault. She successfully cleared a height of 4.30 metres, finishing nineteenth overall in the qualifying rounds, and tying her position with Greece's Afroditi Skafida, and Poland's Joanna Piwowarska.

Her two sisters, Maria Leonor Tavares and Elisabete Tavares Ansel also competed in the pole vault.

== Competition record ==
Year	Competition	Venue	Position	Notes
Representing Portugal
1999	European Junior Championships	Riga, Latvia	14th (q)	3.55 m
2001	European Junior Championships	Grosseto, Italy	6th	3.90 m
2003	European U23 Championships	Bydgoszcz, Poland	9th	3.80 m
2003	Universiade	Daegu, South Korea	8th	4.10 m
2004	Ibero-American Championships	Huelva, Spain	5th	4.10 m
2005	European Indoor Championships	Madrid, Spain	18th (q)	4.15 m
2005	Universiade	İzmir, Turkey	–	NM
2007	Universiade	Bangkok, Thailand	11th	4.10 m
2008	Olympic Games	Beijing, China	19th (q)	4.30 m
2009	World Championships	Berlin, Germany	26th (q)	4.25 m
2010	European Championships	Barcelona, Spain	24th (q)	3.95 m
