= Fabiana Murer =

Brazilian pole vaulter

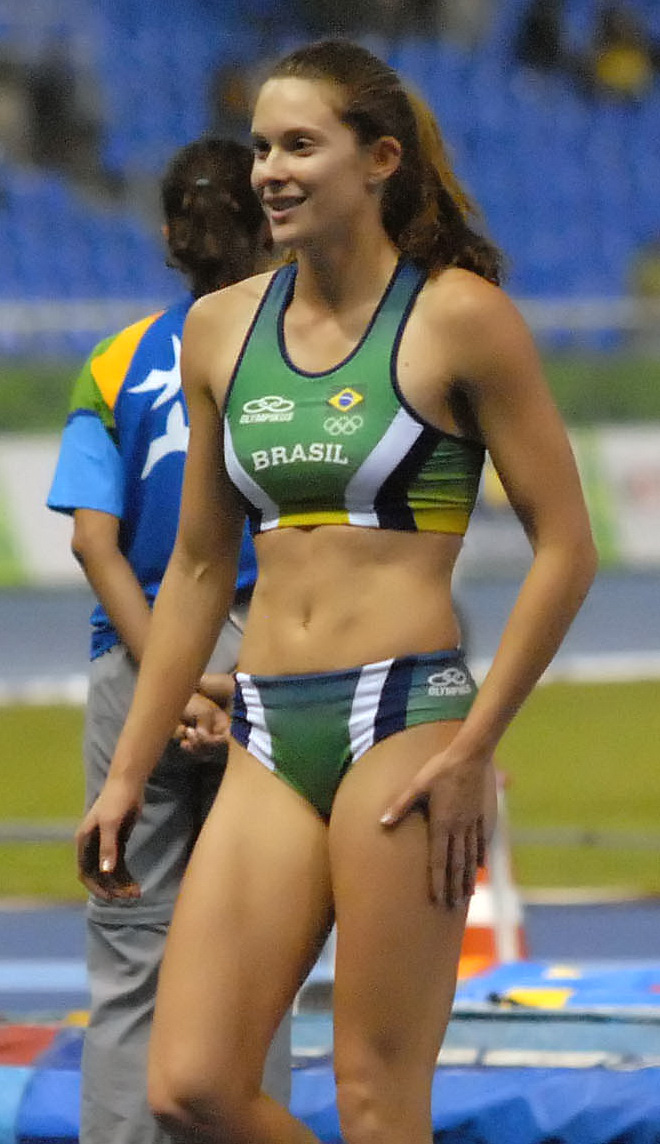

Personal information
- Full name: Fabiana de Almeida Murer
- Born: 16 March 1981 (age 45) Campinas, São Paulo, Brazil
- Height: 1.72 m (5 ft 7 1/2 in)
- Weight: 57 kg (126 lb)

Sport
- Country: Brazil
- Sport: Athletics
- Event: Pole vault
- Coached by: Vitaly Petrov, Élson de Souza
Medal record
World Championships
Gold medal – first place	2011 Daegu	Pole vault
Silver medal – second place	2015 Beijing	Pole vault
World Indoor Championships
Gold medal – first place	2010 Doha	Pole vault
Bronze medal – third place	2008 Valencia	Pole vault
Pan American Games
Gold medal – first place	2007 Rio de Janeiro	Pole vault
Silver medal – second place	2011 Guadalajara	Pole vault
Silver medal – second place	2015 Toronto	Pole vault
South American Games
Gold medal – first place	2014 Santiago	Pole vault
South American Championships
Gold medal – first place	2006 Tunja	Pole vault
Gold medal – first place	2007 São Paulo	Pole vault
Gold medal – first place	2009 Lima	Pole vault
Gold medal – first place	2011 Buenos Aires	Pole vault
Silver medal – second place	2005 Cali	Pole vault
- Updated on 26 August 2015

Fabiana de Almeida Murer (born 16 March 1981) is a retired Brazilian pole vaulter. She holds the South American record in the event with an indoor best of 4.82 m and an outdoor best of 4.87 m, making her the fourth highest vaulter ever at the time, now the eighth. She won gold medals at the 2011 World Championships, 2010 World Indoor Championships, and 2007 Pan American Games. Murer represented Brazil at the 2008, 2012 and 2016 Summer Olympics. She is a four-time South American Champion with wins in 2006, 2007, 2009 and 2011. Murer was coached by both the Ukrainian Vitaly Petrov, who managed the world record holders Sergei Bubka and Yelena Isinbayeva, and her husband, Élson Miranda de Souza, a former pole vaulter himself.

== Career ==
Murer set an outdoor personal best of 4.80 metres in June 2008 in São Paulo. This was a South American record. She finished tenth at the 2008 Summer Olympics with a vault of 4.50 m, however, unable to scale the heights that she had in June. During the competition, the organisers lost one of Murer's poles, causing her to underperform as she spent over 10 minutes trying to get the pole back.

She improved her outdoor record to 4.82 m in June 2009 at the Troféu Brasil Caixa de Atletismo meet. She made the jump en route to winning her fifth Brazilian championships in the event, breaking the area record for the eleventh time and placing joint sixth in the all-time lists. She competed at the 2009 World Championships in Athletics in Berlin but she failed to match her early season form, finishing with a best clearance of 4.55 m. She improved to 4.60 m at the 2009 IAAF World Athletics Final, winning the silver medal.

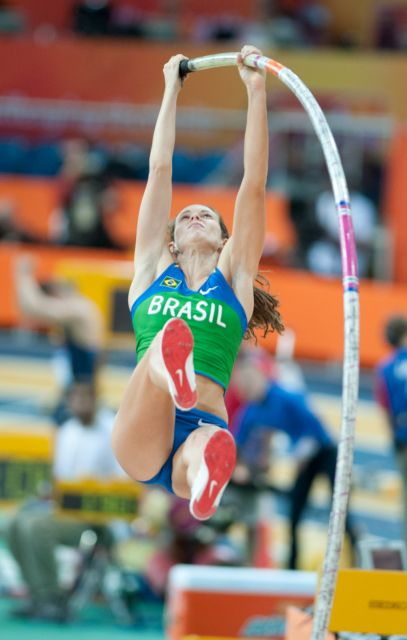
Murer at the 2010 World Indoor Championships where she won the gold medal

At the 2010 IAAF World Indoor Championships, Murer took advantage of Yelena Isinbayeva's failure at 4.75 m and continued at 4.80 m, clearing first time and winning her first global championships. Murer improved her indoor mark to 4.83 m at the Grand Prix in Birmingham, United Kingdom. She further improved her outdoor record in June to 4.85 m at the 2010 Ibero-American Championships in San Fernando, Spain. This mark placed her as the fourth greatest pole vaulter on the all-time lists. She then attempted to vault over 4.93 m, but failed three times.

She was dominant on the 2010 IAAF Diamond League circuit, winning three out of the six Diamond League race events. Her vault of 4.81 m to win at the Weltklasse Zurich meeting made her the inaugural Diamond League winner of the women's pole vault. She was selected to represent the Americas team at the 2010 IAAF Continental Cup, and although she won the bronze medal, her mark of 4.50 m was far from her year's best. She retained her national title at the Troféu Brasil de Atletismo, vaulting 4.70 m to bring a close to her season.

In 2011, Murer became the first Brazilian to win the IAAF World Championship, vaulting 4.85 m at the 2011 World Championships in Athletics in Daegu.

Despite high expectations for the 2012 Summer Olympics, Murer did not qualify for the finals. She failed on the first two attempts for 4.55 m, and gave up on the last, complaining about unfavorable wind conditions.

In 2014, Murer won the second Diamond League circuit, winning four out of the seven diamond race events.

Up until 2015, Murer's post-Olympics performances were underwhelming. Then, she earned a silver medal at both the 2015 Pan American Games and the 2015 World Championships, surpassed only by the Cuban Yarisley Silva. In the latter, Murer reached again her personal best of 4.85 m.

On 3 July 2016, she vaulted 4.87 m at the Troféu Brasil de Atletismo in São Bernardo do Campo, the Brazilian athletics trials to Rio 2016, improving her own Brazilian and South American records again. That same month, after attending the Herculis Diamond League meet, Murer reported pain in her neck. Despite treating it, by the time of the London Grand Prix, Murer was feeling a lack of strength in her arms. Tests revealed a cervical spinal disc herniation, leading Murer to go through extensive physical therapy to ensure she would perform normally during the 2016 Summer Olympics at home. Still, by the time of the Games, Murer failed in her first attempts at clearing 4.55 m. She later attributed the failure on not being fully recovered from the hernia.

== Achievements ==
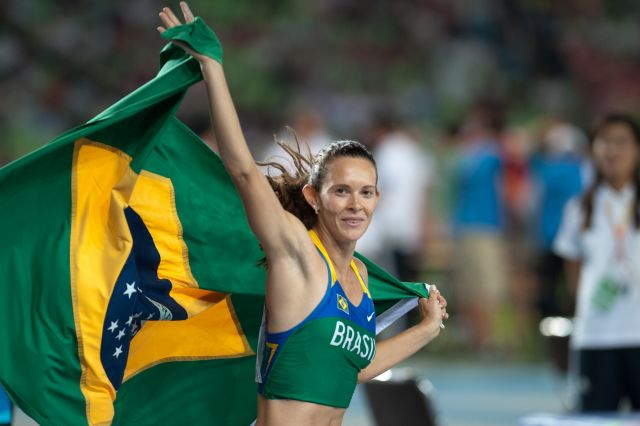
Murer celebrating her title at the 2011 World Athletics Championships

Year	Competition	Venue	Position	Notes
1998	South American Junior Championships	Córdoba, Argentina	1st	3.52 m
1998	World Junior Championships	Annecy, France	20th (q)	3.65 m
1999	South American Championships	Bogotá, Colombia	3rd	3.70 m
1999	Pan American Junior Championships	Tampa, United States	2nd	3.75 m
1999	Pan American Games	Winnipeg, Canada	9th	3.50 m
1999	South American Junior Championships	Concepción, Chile	1st	3.70 m
2000	Ibero-American Championships	Rio de Janeiro, Brazil	5th	3.70 m
2000	South American Junior Championships	São Leopoldo, Brazil	1st	3.75 m
2000	World Junior Championships	Santiago, Chile	10th	3.70 m
2001	South American Championships	Manaus, Brazil	6th	3.70 m
2004	Ibero-American Championships	Huelva, Spain	8th	3.90 m
2005	South American Championships	Cali, Colombia	2nd	4.00 m
2005	World Championships	Helsinki, Finland	15th (q)	4.40 m
2006	World Indoor Championships	Moscow, Russia	15th (q)	4.35 m
2006	Ibero-American Championships	Ponce, Puerto Rico	1st	4.56 m
2006	World Athletics Final	Stuttgart, Germany	5th	4.50 m
2006	World Cup	Athens, Greece	2nd	4.55 m
2006	South American Championships	Tunja, Colombia	1st	4.47 m
2007	South American Championships	São Paulo, Brazil	1st	4.50 m CR
2007	Pan American Games	Rio de Janeiro, Brazil	1st	4.60 m CR
2007	World Championships	Osaka, Japan	6th	4.65 m
2008	World Indoor Championships	Valencia, Spain	3rd	4.70 m AR
2008	Olympic Games	Beijing, China	10th	4.50 m
2008	World Athletics Final	Stuttgart, Germany	6th	4.50 m
2009	South American Championships	Lima, Peru	1st	4.60 m CR
2009	World Championships	Berlin, Germany	5th	4.55 m
2010	World Indoor Championships	Doha, Qatar	1st	4.80 m
2010	Ibero-American Championships	San Fernando, Spain	1st	4.85 m AR
2011	South American Championships	Buenos Aires, Argentina	1st	4.70 m CR
2011	World Championships	Daegu, South Korea	1st	4.85 m =AR
2011	Pan American Games	Guadalajara, Mexico	2nd	4.70 m
2012	Olympic Games	London, United Kingdom	15th (q)	4.50 m
2013	World Championships	Moscow, Russia	5th	4.65 m
2014	World Indoor Championships	Sopot, Poland	4th	4.70 m
2014	South American Games	Santiago, Chile	1st	4.40 m
2015	Pan American Games	Toronto, Canada	2nd	4.80 m
2015	World Championships	Beijing, China	2nd	4.85 m =AR
2016	World Indoor Championships	Portland, United States	6th	4.60 m
2016	Ibero-American Championships	Rio de Janeiro, Brazil	1st	4.60 m
2016	Olympic Games	Rio de Janeiro, Brazil	–	NM

== Personal bests ==
Event	Height (m)	Venue	Date
Pole vault, indoor	4.83 AR	Nevers, France	7 February 2015
Pole vault, outdoor	4.87 AR	São Bernardo do Campo, Brazil	3 July 2016

- All information taken from IAAF Profile.

Awards
Preceded by Sarah Menezes	Brazilian Sportswomen of the Year; 2010–2011	Succeeded by Sheilla Castro
