= Monika Pyrek =

Polish pole vaulter

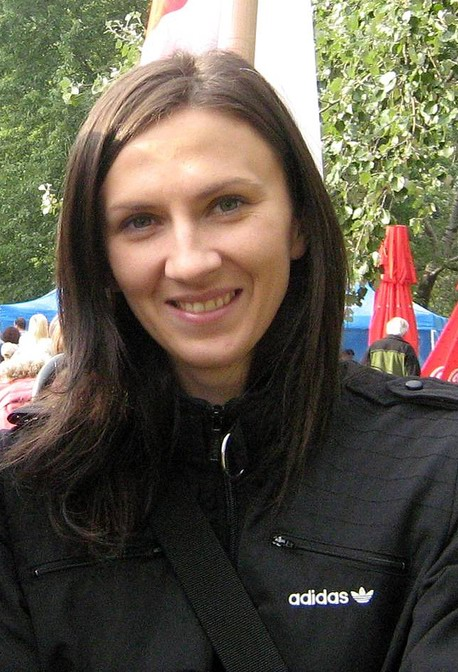
- Monika Pyrek in 2007

Personal information
- Nationality: Poland
- Born: 11 August 1980 (age 45) Gdynia, Poland
- Height: 1.70 m (5 ft 7 in)
- Weight: 57 kg (126 lb) (2012)

Sport
- Sport: Athletics
- Event: Pole vault
- Club: MKL Szczecin
Medal record
Women's athletics
Representing Poland
Event	1st	2nd	3rd
Olympic Games	0	0	0
World Championships	0	2	1
World Indoor Championships	0	1	1
European Championships	0	1	0
European Indoor Championships	0	0	2
European U23 Championships	1	0	0
World Athletics Final	0	3	0
Total	1	7	4
World Championships
Silver medal – second place	2005 Helsinki	Pole vault
Silver medal – second place	2009 Berlin	Pole vault
Bronze medal – third place	2001 Edmonton	Pole vault
World Indoor Championships
Bronze medal – third place	2003 Birmingham	Pole vault
Bronze medal – third place	2008 Valencia	Pole vault
European Championships
Silver medal – second place	2006 Gothenburg	Pole vault
European Indoor Championships
Bronze medal – third place	2002 Vienna	Pole vault
Bronze medal – third place	2005 Madrid	Pole vault
European Team Championships
Gold medal – first place	2009 Leiria	Pole vault

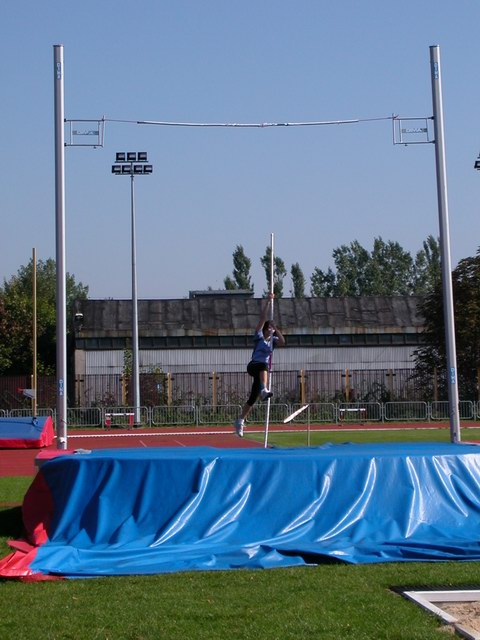
Monika Pyrek training at Miejski Stadion Lekkoatletyczny w Szczecinie, her club's stadium in Szczecin

Monika Zofia Pyrek-Rokita, née Pyrek, (11 August 1980) is a retired Polish pole vaulter.

Born in Gdynia, competing at the 2004 Olympics, she placed fourth with 4.55 metres, just behind another Polish pole vaulter born in Gdynia, Anna Rogowska. Monika Pyrek won a silver medal in the 2005 World Championships in Athletics with the result 4.60 m. She also won the silver medal at the 2006 European Athletics Championships.

Monika Pyrek's personal best is 4.82 metres.

She won the Polish Championship several times, the last in 2007 in Poznań.

== Medical Condition ==
In the interview with Sportowe Fakty, Pyrek revealed that in 2003, she was diagnosed with Hashimoto's thyroiditis. She wondered if she was diagnosed sooner, she might have won more medals.

For her sport achievements, she received:
Knight's Cross of the Order of Polonia Restituta (5th Class) in 2009.

She officially retired on 11 January 2013. A day later she married Norbert Rokita, her longtime agent and life partner.

== Major competitions record ==
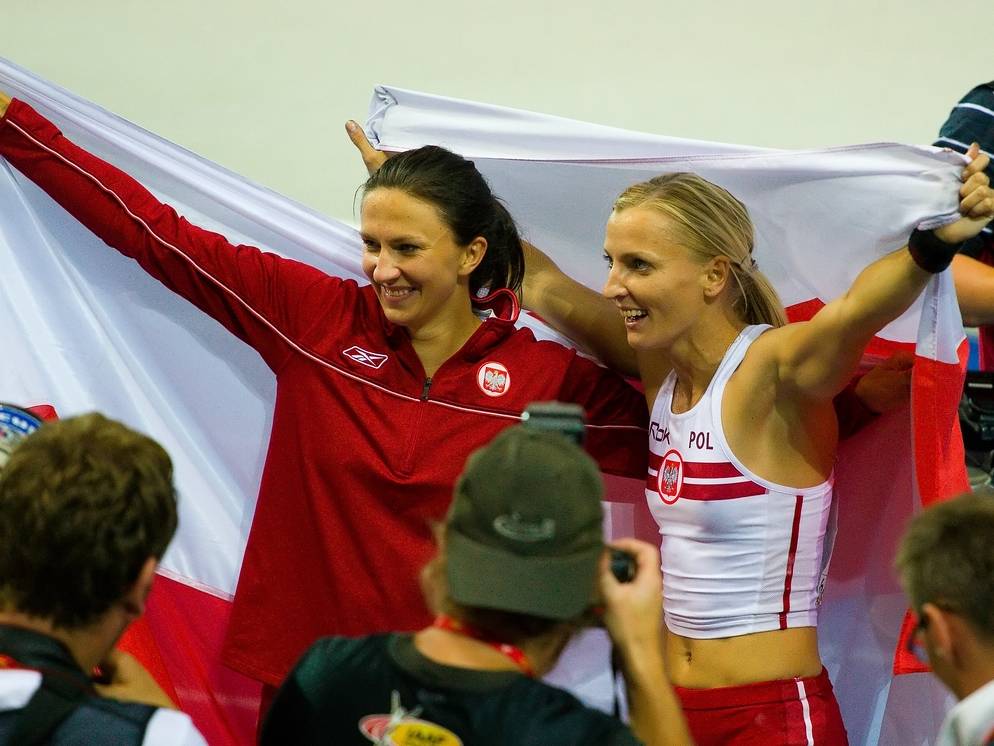
Monika Pyrek (left) after winning the silver at the 2009 World Championships.

Year	Competition	Venue	Position	Notes
Representing Poland
1997	European Junior Championships	Ljubljana, Slovenia	10th	3.80 m
1998	World Junior Championships	Annecy, France	2nd	4.10 m
1998	European Championships	Budapest, Hungary	7th	4.15 m
1999	World Indoor Championships	Maebashi, Japan	11th	4.20 m
1999	European Junior Championships	Riga, Latvia	4th	4.10 m
2000	European Indoor Championships	Ghent, Belgium	9th (q)	4.20 m
2000	Olympic Games	Sydney, Australia	7th	4.40 m
2001	European U23 Championships	Amsterdam, Netherlands	1st	4.40 m
2001	World Championships	Edmonton, Canada	3rd	4.55 m
2001	Goodwill Games	Brisbane, Australia	4th	4.35 m
2002	European Indoor Championships	Vienna, Austria	3rd	4.60 m
2002	European Championships	Munich, Germany	13th (q)	4.30 m
2003	World Indoor Championships	Birmingham, United Kingdom	3rd	4.45 m
2003	World Championships	Paris, France	4th	4.55 m
2003	World Athletics Final	Monte Carlo, Monaco	4th	4.50 m
2004	World Indoor Championships	Budapest, Hungary	5th	4.50 m
2004	Olympic Games	Athens, Greece	4th	4.55 m
2005	European Indoor Championships	Madrid, Spain	3rd	4.70 m
2005	World Championships	Helsinki, Finland	2nd	4.60 m
2005	World Athletics Final	Monte Carlo, Monaco	2nd	4.62 m
2006	World Indoor Championships	Moscow, Russia	4th	4.65 m
2006	European Championships	Gothenburg, Sweden	2nd	4.65 m
2006	World Athletics Final	Stuttgart, Germany	2nd	4.65 m
2007	World Championships	Osaka, Japan	4th	4.75 m
2007	World Athletics Final	Stuttgart, Germany	2nd	4.82 m
2008	World Indoor Championships	Valencia, Spain	3rd	4.70 m
2008	Olympic Games	Beijing, China	5th	4.70 m
2009	World Championships	Berlin, Germany	2nd	4.65 m
2011	World Championships	Daegu, South Korea	10th	4.50 m
2012	European Championships	Helsinki, Finland	13th (q)	4.35 m
2012	Olympic Games	London, United Kingdom	15th (q)	4.40 m

== Taniec z Gwiazdami ==
Monika Pyrek won the 12th season of Polish Dancing with the Stars - Taniec z Gwiazdami.

Week #	Dance/Song	Judges' score				Result
Week #	Dance/Song	Pavlović	Wodecki	Tyszkiewicz	Galiński	Result
1	Group Salsa/ "Honeymoon Song"	N/A	N/A	N/A	N/A	Safe
2	Quickstep/ "Lemon Tree"	8	8	10	9	Safe
3	Jive/ "Maneater"	8	9	10	9	Safe
4	Foxtrot/ "Blue Velvet"	8	9	9	9	Safe
5	Samba/ "Bailamos"	8	9	10	9	Safe
6	Waltz in American Smooth/ "Just the Way You Are"	7	9	9	7	Safe
7	Cha-cha-cha/ "Baw mnie"	10	10	10	10	Safe
8	Rumba/ "(Where Do I Begin?) Love Story"	7	10	10	10	Safe
9	Tango/ "Nie wierz, nie ufaj mi"	10	10	10	10	Safe
10	Salsa/ "Demasiado Corazon"; Quickstep/ "We No Speak Americano"	9; 8	9; 10	10; 10	9; 8	Safe
11	Jive/ "Hey Boy (Get Your Ass Up)"; Viennese Waltz/ "Where the Wild Roses Grow"	6; 10	9; 10	10; 10	7; 10	Safe
12 Semi-finals	Paso Doble/ "Bad Romance"; Argentine Tango/ "Sensuel"	8; 10	9; 10	10; 10	9; 10	Bottom Two
13 Finals	Cha-cha-cha/ "Baw mnie" Tango/ "Nie wierz, nie ufaj mi" Freestyle/"Nothing Compares 2 U"	10; 10; 10	10; 10; 10	10; 10; 10	10; 10; 10	Won
