= Nikoleta Kyriakopoulou =

Greek pole vaulter (born 1986)

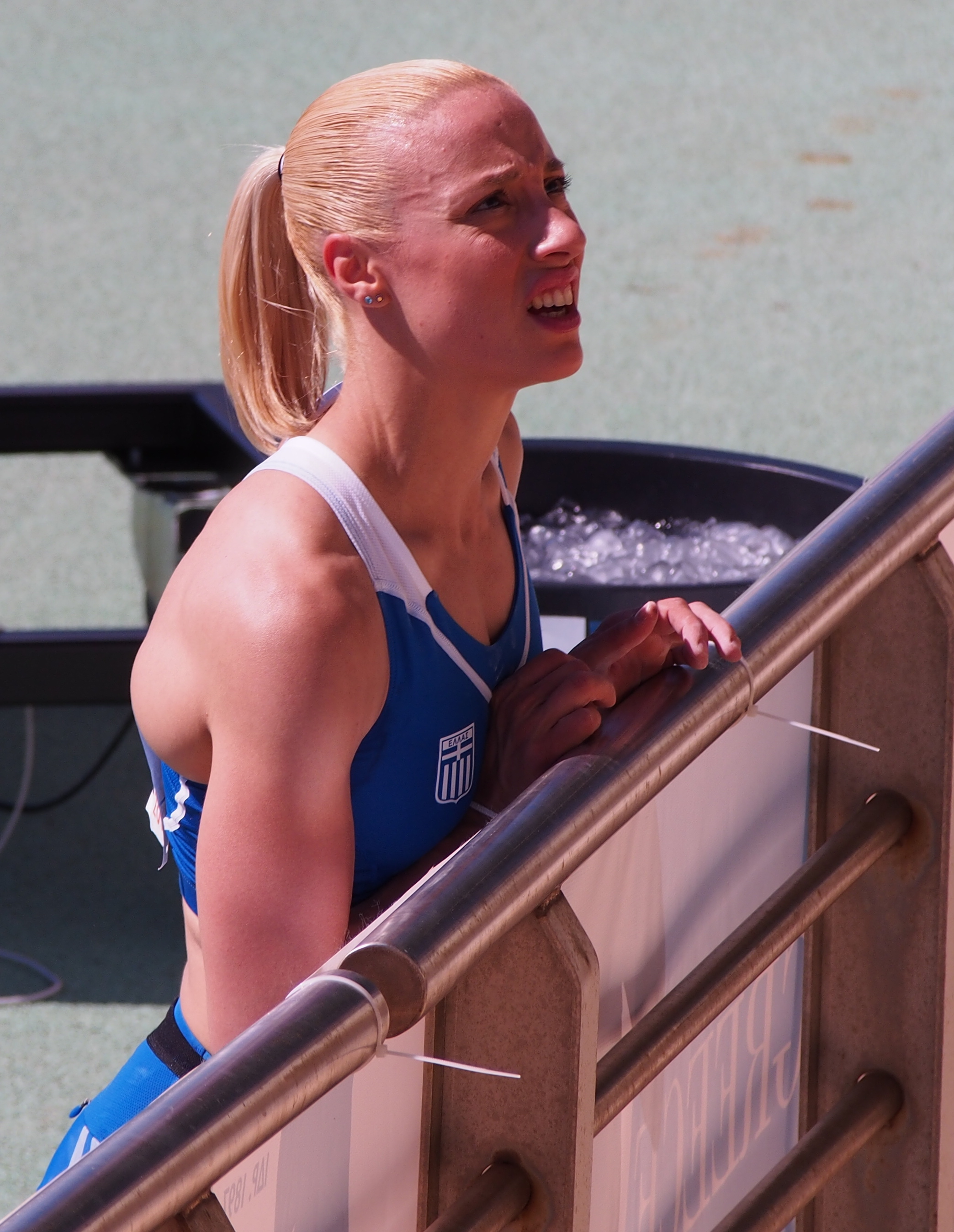

Personal information
- Born: 21 March 1986 (age 40) Athens, Greece
- Height: 1.67 m (5 ft 6 in)
- Weight: 58 kg (128 lb)

Sport
- Country: Greece
- Sport: Athletics
- Event: Pole vault

Achievements and titles
- Personal bests: 4.81 m (i); 4.83 m
Medal record
World Championships
Bronze medal – third place	2015 Beijing	Pole vault
European Championships
Silver medal – second place	2018 Berlin	Pole vault
Bronze medal – third place	2012 Helsinki	Pole vault
European Indoor Championships
Bronze medal – third place	2019 Glasgow	Pole vault
European Team Championships
Gold medal – first place	2015 Heraklion	Pole vault
Mediterranean Games
Gold medal – first place	Pescara 2009	Pole Vault
Bronze medal – third place	Tarragona 2018	Pole Vault

Nikoleta 'Nikol' Kyriakopoulou (Greek: Νικολέτα "Νικολ" Κυριακοπούλου, born 21 March 1986) is a Greek retired pole vaulter. Nikoleta was 8th at the Olympic Games in Tokyo 2021. She also won the bronze medal at the World Championships in Beijing in 2015 jumping 4.80m. During the 2015 season, she set five Greek records (indoor and outdoor) raising the bar to 4,83 meters. The same year, she became the first Greek athlete to win the IAAF Diamond League. During her career she broke 11 times the Greek National record (indoor and outdoor).

Her first success in a major event was in 2012 when she won the bronze medal at the European Championships in Helsinki. One year earlier, in 2011, she finished 8th at the IAAF World Championships in Daegu. She also won the 2009 Mediterranean Games with a Games record of 4.50 meters, while as a junior athlete she was 6th at the World Championships in Grosseto in 2004.

Nikoleta did not compete in 2016 Rio Olympics due to injury.

In 2017 she became a mother of a baby girl and announced her return to competition for 2018. She won the silver medal at the 2018 European Championships and bronze medal at the European Championships in Glasgow in 2019.

She was named the Greek Female Athlete of the Year for 2015. Nikoleta retired from competing in 2024 after 22 years of a successful career.

== International competitions ==
Year	Competition	Venue	Position	Notes
Representing Greece
2004	World Junior Championships	Grosseto, Italy	6th	4.00 m
2005	European Junior Championships	Kaunas, Lithuania	7th	4.00 m
2007	Universiade	Bangkok, Thailand	13th (q)	3.90 m
2008	Olympic Games	Beijing, China	27th (q)	4.15 m
2009	Mediterranean Games	Pescara, Italy	1st	4.50 m GR
2009	World Championships	Berlin, Germany	19th (q)	4.40 m
2010	World Indoor Championships	Doha, Qatar	2nd (q)	4.45 m
2010	European Championships	Barcelona, Spain	13th (q)	4.25 m
2011	European Indoor Championships	Paris, France	9th	4.35 m
2011	World Championships	Daegu, South Korea	8th	4.65 m
2012	European Championships	Helsinki, Finland	3rd	4.60 m
2012	Olympic Games	London, United Kingdom	19th (q)	4.25 m
2013	European Indoor Championships	Gothenburg, Sweden	10th (q)	4.36 m
2013	World Championships	Moscow, Russia	13th (q)	4.45 m
2014	World Indoor Championships	Sopot, Poland	12th	4.30 m
2014	European Championships	Zurich, Switzerland	7th	4.35 m
2015	European Indoor Championships	Prague, Czech Republic	5th	4.50 m
2015	World Championships	Beijing, China	3rd	4.80 m
2015	2015 IAAF Diamond League		1st	details
2016	World Indoor Championships	Portland, United States	6th	4.60 m
2016	European Championships	Amsterdam, Netherlands	4th	4.55 m
2018	Mediterranean Games	Tarragona, Spain	3rd	4.31 m
2018	European Championships	Berlin, Germany	2nd	4.80 m
2019	European Indoor Championships	Glasgow, UK	3rd	4.65 m
2019	World Championships	Doha, Qatar	13th	4.50 m
2021	Olympic Games	Tokyo, Japan	8th	4.50 m
2022	World Championships	Eugene, United States	24th (q)	4.35 m
2023	European Indoor Championships	Istanbul, Turkey	15th (q)	4.30 m

== Personal bests ==
Event	Record	Date	Venue
Pole vault outdoor	4.83 m	4 July 2015	Paris, France
Pole vault indoor	4.81 m	17 February 2016	Stockholm, Sweden

== Personal life ==
Nikoleta is married and has a daughter. She partially hailed from Emmanouil Pappas, Serres.
