= Jenn Suhr =

American pole vaulter (born 1982)

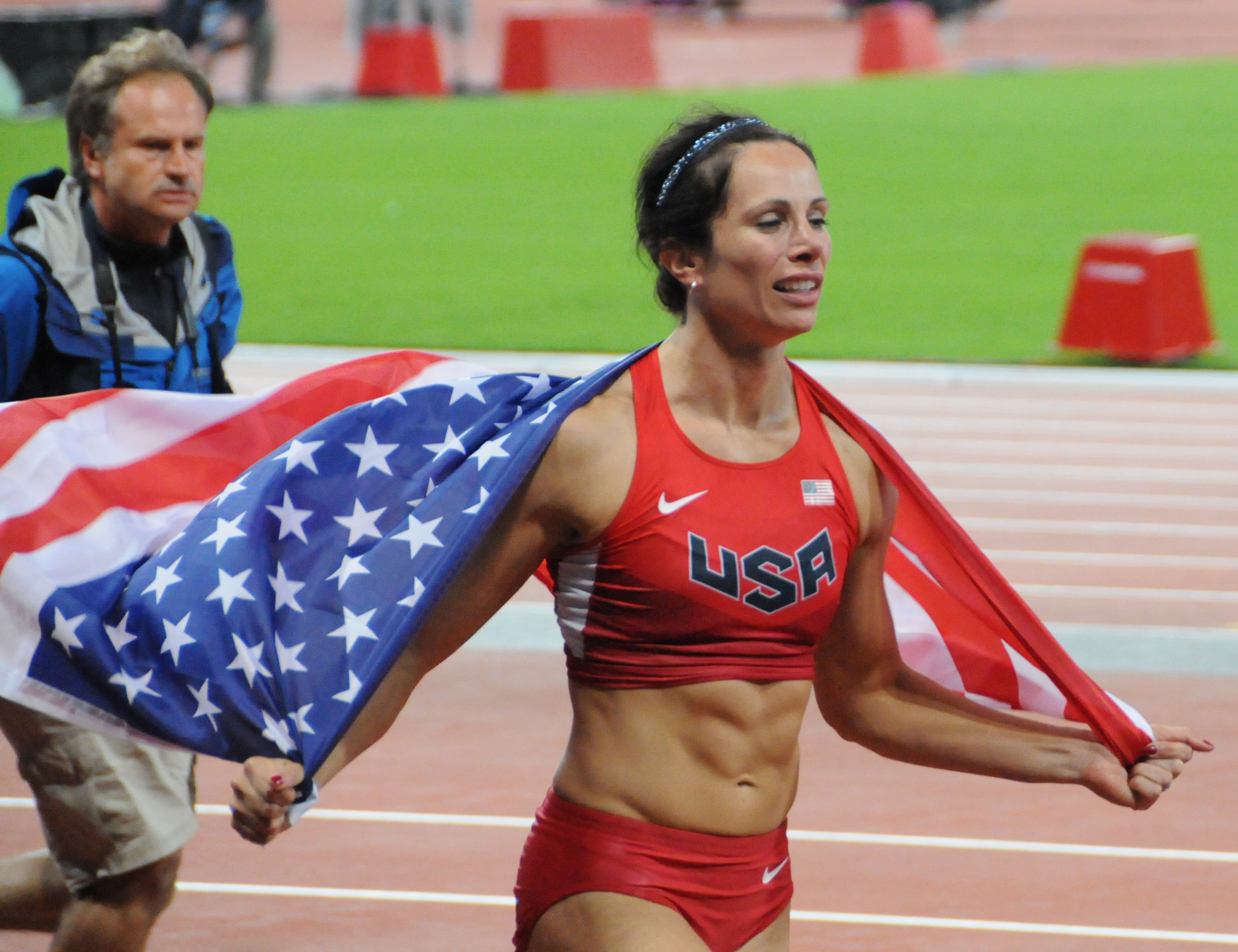
- Suhr at the 2012 Olympics

Personal information
- Full name: Jennifer Lynn Suhr
- Born: Jennifer Lynn Stuczynski; February 5, 1982 (age 44) Fredonia, New York, U.S.
- Height: 6 ft 0 in (183 cm)
- Weight: 145 lb (66 kg)
- Spouse: Rick Suhr (m. 2010)

Sport
- Country: United States
- Sport: Track and field
- Event: Pole vault
- Retired: 2022

Achievements and titles
- Olympic finals: 2008 Beijing, 2012 London
- World finals: 2008 Valencia, 2016 Portland
- National finals: 2005–2016 USA
- Highest world ranking: 1st (2011)
- Personal bests: outdoor: 4.93 m (16 ft 2 in) (2018) indoor: 5.03 m (16 ft 6 in) (2016, WR)
Medal record
Olympic Games
Gold medal – first place	2012 London	Pole vault
Silver medal – second place	2008 Beijing	Pole vault
World Championships
Silver medal – second place	2013 Moscow	Pole vault
World Indoor Championships
Gold medal – first place	2016 Portland	Pole vault
Silver medal – second place	2008 Valencia	Pole vault
Pan American Games
Bronze medal – third place	2015 Toronto	Pole vault
- Updated on September 2, 2024

Jennifer Lynn Suhr (née Stuczynski; born February 5, 1982) is an American former pole vaulter. She has been an Olympic and World champion, has been ranked #1 in the World, has been the #1 American pole vaulter since 2006, and has won a total of 17 US National Championships (7 Indoor, 10 Outdoor). She holds the world indoor pole vault record at 5.03 m (16 ft 6 in). She holds the American women's pole vault record indoors. In 2008, she won the U.S. Olympic trials, setting an American record of 4.92 m (16 ft 2 in) and won a silver medal in the Beijing Olympics. She won the gold medal at the London Olympics on August 6, 2012. Track & Field News named her American Female Athlete of the Year for 2008.

== Biography ==
Suhr was born to Mark and Sue Stuczynski, grocery store owners in Fredonia, New York. The grocery store was previously owned by her grandfather, "Bunk" Stuczynski. She got involved in sports at a young age, playing softball at age 6. At 9, she competed in an adult golf league with her grandfather. At Fredonia High School, she played softball, basketball, soccer, and track and field, and won the New York State pentathlon title in 2000 as a senior.

Suhr attended Roberts Wesleyan University in Rochester, New York, where she competed in basketball and track and field. She averaged 24.3 points and 6.7 rebounds a game for Roberts Wesleyan in 2003–04, taking her team to the NCCAA national championship game. She graduated as the school's all-time leading scorer in basketball with 1,819 points.

On January 3, 2010, Jenn married her coach, Rick Suhr, in Rochester.

== Pole vaulting career ==
=== 2004 ===
Jenn began pole vaulting with coach Rick Suhr.

=== 2005 ===
In the 2005 USA Indoor Championships in Boston, Jenn Stuczynski entered as an unknown, unseeded competitor and won the US title having only trained for 10 months. She went on to set three personal bests, eventually clearing 4.35 m (14 ft 3 1/4 in) on her first attempt to leapfrog from a tie for third. Later that indoor season she won the NAIA indoor national title in the pole vault.

=== 2006 ===
Suhr began her career with her coach Rick Suhr providing financial support to her by re-mortgaging his home. Suhr started the 2006 indoor season with personal bests at nearly every meet and becoming the #2 American all time, behind only Stacy Dragila, with her clearance of 4.68 m (15 ft 4 in). She captured her first USA Outdoor title with her winning clearance of 4.55 m (14 ft 11 in) at the 2006 AT&T USA Outdoor Championships. She finished third at the 2006 World Athletics Final.

=== 2007 ===
Suhr won the USA Indoor Track & Field Championships in Boston on February 25, 2007.

On May 20, 2007, Suhr broke the American outdoor pole vault record with a clearance of 4.84 m (15 ft 11 in) at the Adidas Track Classic in Carson, California, beating the previous record set by Stacy Dragila in 2004 by one centimeter.

Two weeks later, at the Reebok Grand Prix on June 2, 2007, Suhr cleared 4.88 m (16 ft 0 in), breaking the American record for a second time and becoming the second highest vaulter in history behind Russian Yelena Isinbayeva. Suhr then attempted a new world record vault of 5.02 m (16 ft 6 in) – one centimeter higher than Isinbayeva's record at the time – but failed on three attempts at the height.

Suhr took her second national outdoor title at the USA Outdoor Track and Field Championships in Indianapolis with a vault of 4.45 m (14 ft 7 in), her only successful clearance of the competition The victory secured Suhr a place on the US team for the 2007 World Championships in Athletics, held in Osaka, Japan. Competing in her first major global championship, Suhr finished in 10th place in the final, with a 4.50 m (14 ft 9 in) clearance.

=== 2008 ===
Suhr won the Indoor U.S. Nationals, which qualified her for the 2008 IAAF World Indoor Championships – Women's pole vault in Valencia, Spain, where she finished second on a countback to Yelena Isinbayeva. Both cleared 4.75 m (15 ft 7 in).

At the Adidas Track Classic on May 18, 2008, Suhr cleared 4.90 m (16 ft 1 in), breaking her own American record. She missed all three attempts at 5.02 m (16 ft 6 in), which would have been a world record. The U.S. Olympic Committee named her its female athlete of the month for May.

At the U.S. Olympic Trials on July 6, 2008, Suhr cleared 4.92 m (16 ft 2 in), winning the trials and breaking her own American record.

At the Aviva Grand Prix on July 25, 2008, two women attempted the world record in the same meet for the first time. Both Suhr and Isinbayeva were unsuccessful.

At the Olympics in Beijing on August 18, 2008, Suhr finished second to Isinbayeva, clearing 4.80 m (15 ft 9 in). Isinbayeva broke her own world record with a jump of 5.05 m (16 ft 7 in). Suhr finished with the silver medal and credited her coach Rick Suhr for his strict regimen in preparing her for the competitiveness and high stress of the Olympics.

=== 2009 ===
She set a new American record on February 7, 2009, at the Boston Indoor Games when she cleared 15 ft 9.75 in (4.82 m). Suhr won each Visa Championship Meet and broke her own American record with a vault of 15 ft 10 in (4.83 m) at the US Indoor Nationals in Boston on March 1, 2009, giving her a 7th US Title.

On July 1, 2009, she cleared 15 ft 3 in (4.65 m) at the 2009 USA Outdoor Track and Field Championships in Oregon to win another American title. Suhr was forced to withdraw from the US team for the 2009 world championships in Berlin with an Achilles tendon injury.

=== 2010 ===
On June 27, 2010, Suhr won the USA Outdoor Gill Women's Pole Vault in Des Moines, Iowa, with a vault of 4.89 m (16 ft 1 in). It was her fifth consecutive US outdoor title and was the best mark by any woman vaulter in the world for 2010.

=== 2011 ===
On February 27, 2011, Suhr won her tenth national title overall with a win at the 2011 USA Indoor Track and Field Championships with another national record clearance of 4.86 m (15 ft 11 in) for the indoor event. Her run of five consecutive national outdoor titles was ended by Kylie Hutson at the USA Outdoor Track and Field Championships, with Suhr finishing in second place with a 4.60 m (15 ft 1 in) vault.

Suhr cleared 4.91 m (16 ft 1 in) – the highest vault of the year – in Rochester, New York on July 26. She subsequently finished in fourth place at the world championships in Daegu, South Korea with a leap of 4.70 m (15 ft 5 in).

Suhr also took Diamond League victories in London and Zurich during the season, defeating 2011 world champion Fabiana Murer and three other former world champions in the latter competition.

Track & Field News ranked Suhr the number one women's pole vaulter in the world for 2011.

=== 2012 ===
She opened 2012 with an American record clearance of 4.88 m at the Boston Indoor Grand Prix, re-establishing herself as the second highest female vaulter of all time. She won the USATF Indoor Championships in Albuquerque on Feb 25 with a vault of 4.63. A meet record of 4.65 m followed in the outdoor season at the Drake Relays in April.

On June 24, Suhr won the Olympic Trials (and the United States Championships) to qualify for her second Olympic games.

On August 6, 2012, Jenn Suhr won the gold medal in the women's pole vault at the Olympic Games, defeating Cuba's Yarisley Silva on countback after both competitors had cleared 4.75 m.

=== 2013 ===
On March 2, 2013, Suhr broke Yelena Isinbayeva's world indoor record (set on February 23, 2012, in Stockholm) at the USA Indoor Track & Field Championships in Albuquerque, New Mexico, with a vault of 5.02m (16 ft. 5.5 in.), becoming the 2nd woman in history to vault over 5 meters. Suhr won 2013 USA Outdoor Track and Field Championships in 4.70 m (15 ft 5 in). Suhr earned silver medal at 2013 World Championships in Athletics – Women's pole vault in 4.82 m (15 ft 9 3/4 in).

=== 2014 ===
Suhr earned silver medal at 2014 USA Indoor Track and Field Championships in 4.66 m (15 ft 3 1/4 in). Suhr won 2014 USA Outdoor Track and Field Championships in 4.60 m (15 ft 1 in). Suhr finished 5th in 2014 IAAF World Indoor Championships – Women's pole vault in 4.65 m (15 ft 3 in).

=== 2015 ===
Suhr won 2015 USA Outdoor Track and Field Championships in 4.82 m (15 ft 9 3/4 in).

=== 2016 ===
Suhr broke her own women's indoor pole vault world record at a Division III track and field meet at the State University of New York at Brockport on January 30 with a jump of 5.03 m (16 ft 6 in).
Suhr earned silver medal at 2016 USA Indoor Track and Field Championships in 4.95 m (16 ft 2 3/4 in).
Suhr won gold medal at 2016 World Indoor Championships in 4.90 m (16 ft 3/4 in) in a world indoor championship meet record.

Suhr won the 2016 USA Olympic Trials and competed in the 2016 Summer Olympics in Rio de Janeiro, Brazil. She came down with a severe illness prior to the competition, and although she passed through the first day of qualifying without a problem, she finished in seventh place, below initial expectations. Doctors were never able to identify the cause of Suhr's symptoms.

=== 2022 ===
Suhr announced her retirement in June 2022. Over the course of her career, Jenn Suhr won 17 USA National Championships, 7 indoor and 10 outdoor which included every outdoor national championship from 2006 to 2016 except for 2011.

== Sponsorship ==
In 2006 Suhr signed a 4-year sponsorship with Adidas. In August 2007, Suhr was signed as a brand spokesperson for Nutrilite, a brand of vitamin, mineral and dietary supplements.

== Awards and honors ==
Track & Field News named Suhr the American Female Athlete of the Year for 2008. No male vaulter has ever won the American honor and the only other female winner was Stacy Dragila in 2001. She was inducted to the National Polish-American Sports Hall of Fame in 2024.

== See also ==
- Five metres club

Records
Preceded by Yelena Isinbayeva	Women's indoor pole vault world record holder March 2, 2013 – present	Succeeded by Incumbent
