= Anna Battke =

German pole vaulter

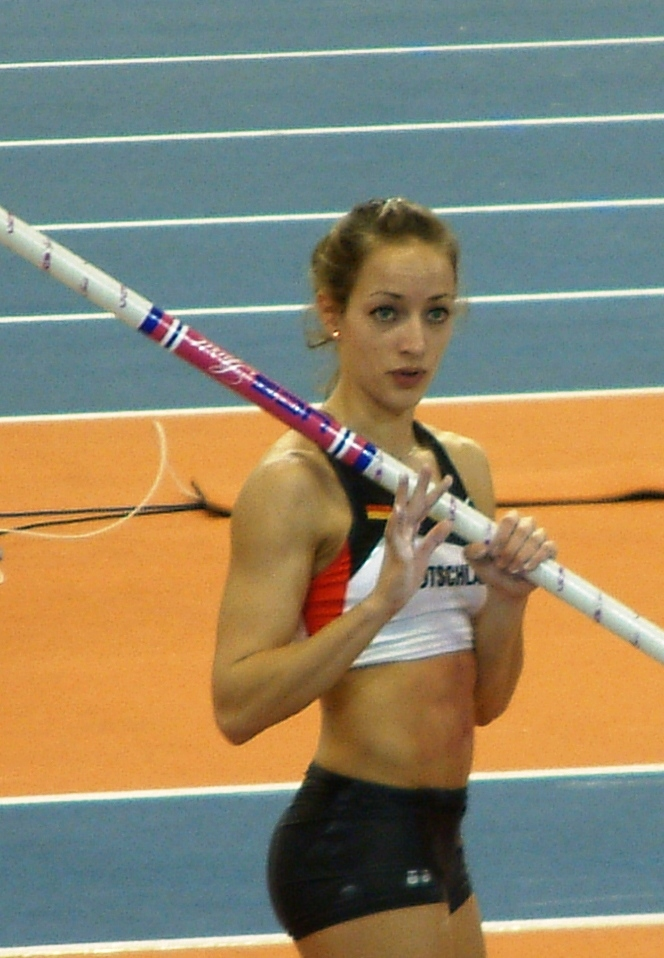
- Anna Battke at the 2008 World Indoor Championships
Medal record
Representing Germany
Women's athletics
European Indoor Championships
Bronze medal – third place	2009 Torino	Pole vault

Anna Battke (born 3 January 1985 in Düsseldorf) is a German pole vaulter.

== Biography ==
She finished eighth at the 2008 World Indoor Championships in Valencia, Spain. Her personal best is 4.68 metres, achieved in 2009 in Berlin.

== See also ==
- Germany all-time top lists - Pole vault
