= Kate Rooney =

English pole vaulter (born 1984)

Personal information
- Nationality: Great Britain
- Born: 7 May 1984 (age 42) Durban, South Africa
- Height: 171 cm (5 ft 7 in)
- Spouse: Martyn Rooney

Sport
- Sport: Athletics
- Event: Pole vault
- Club: Sale Harriers

Kate Rooney (née Dennison; 7 May 1984) is an English pole vaulter. She is a former British record holder both indoors and out, before both of her records were surpassed by Holly Bleasdale in 2011.

Born in Durban, South Africa, Rooney came from a sporting family and moved to Alsager, England, when she was four years old. She first became interested in athletics through gymnastics. Rooney was selected to compete at national and international levels, finishing fourth in the British Championships, but did not feel passionate about the sport and changed to pole vault in 2000. She became the first British junior athlete to jump 4.00 meters, as she finished seventh at the 2002 World Junior Championships in Kingston, Jamaica.

She competed at the 2006 Commonwealth Games and was the top English performer, finishing seventh overall. Rooney completed a degree in psychology at University of Staffordshire and turned professional, committing herself full-time to the sport. Following graduation, she moved to be trained by Steven Rippon at the center of excellence in Loughborough.

Rooney won two outdoor tournaments and five indoor titles in the 2007 athletics season. She competed at her first Olympic Games at Beijing 2008 and was knocked out in seventh place in the second heats but set a new outdoor personal best of 4.40 m. Following this she had surgery on both her Achilles, but this did not affect her form in the next season – she broke the national indoor record, beating Janine Whitlock's seven-year-old record, with a jump of 4.45 m at the 2009 UK Indoor Championships in Sheffield, and bettered that mark by another centimeter at the Birmingham Games a week later.

Following a successful indoor season, Rooney broke the British record in June with a vault of 4.51 m at the Memorial Josefa Odlozila meeting in Prague. Despite the achievement she felt confident of further improvement, setting her eyes on a place in the final at the Berlin World Championships. Another personal best of 4.55 m brought her fourth place in the European Team Championships 2009. After a win at the UK national championships with 4.57 m, she noted the difficulty of the competition she faced in Berlin: several athletes from Germany, Poland, and Russia, including reigning champion Yelena Isinbayeva, were in the running for a medal.

She recorded 4.55 m in the World Championships final, finishing in sixth place overall. A 4.60 m clearance for third place at the Pedros Cup brought an end to a successful season for the Briton, which had seen her beat the national record nine times over the course of eight months.

At the 2010 Commonwealth Games in New Delhi, Rooney won a bronze medal in the women's pole vault.

Since retiring, Rooney has worked in schools and encouraged children's involvement in sport, whilst beginning a further career path in financial services and advice.

== Personal bests ==
Rooney previously held the indoor & outdoor British records. She beat Janine Whitlock's 4.47 m outdoor record in June 2009. She broke the British record nine times in 2009. Her own outdoor record of 4.60m was beaten by Holly Bleasdale in June 2011, with a jump of 4.70m.

Event	Date	Venue	Height
Pole vault, indoor	February 2010	Birmingham, Great Britain	4.60 metres
Pole vault, outdoor	22 July 2011	Barcelona, Spain	4.61 metres

- All information taken from IAAF Profile.
