= Silke Spiegelburg =

German pole vaulter

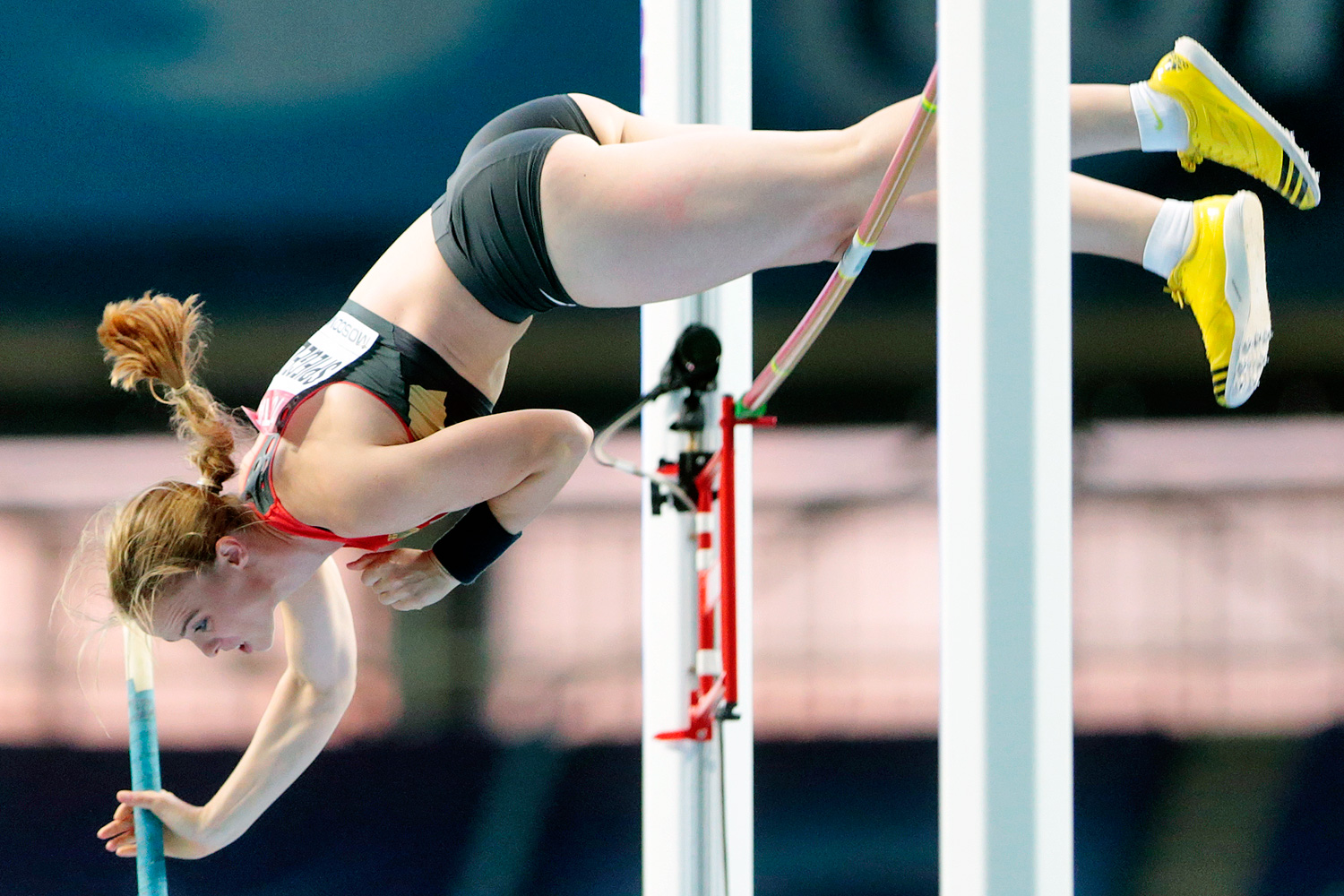
- Spiegelburg during the 2013 World Championships

Personal information
- Born: 17 March 1986 (age 40)
- Height: 1.72 m (5 ft 7 1/2 in)
- Weight: 63 kg (139 lb)

Sport
- Country: Germany
- Sport: Athletics
- Event: Pole vault
Medal record
European Championships
Silver medal – second place	2010 Barcelona	Pole vault
European Indoor Championships
Silver medal – second place	2009 Torino	Pole vault
Silver medal – second place	2011 Paris	Pole vault
- Updated on 6 August 2012

Silke Spiegelburg (born 17 March 1986 in Georgsmarienhütte, Lower Saxony) is a former German pole vaulter. She is the younger sister of Richard Spiegelburg. She represented Germany at the Summer Olympics in 2004, 2008 and 2012, as well as having competed at the World Championships in Athletics. She is a European silver medallist in the event both indoors and outdoors.

Spiegelburg showed her talent for the event from a young age, winning the World Youth title in 2001 before becoming the European Junior champion two years later. She competed at the 2004 Athens Olympics at the age of eighteen and set a world junior record for the pole vault in 2005. She is a two-time national champion in the event and holds the German indoor record with her mark of 4.76 metres.

== Career ==
She won the pole vault at the 2001 World Youth Championships with a height of 4.00 metres. She reached the final of the event at the 2002 World Junior Championships in Athletics the following year, but managed only eighth place. Success came at the 2003 European Athletics Junior Championships, however, as she took the gold medal with a clearance of 4.15 m. She made her Olympic debut the following year at the 2004 Athens Games and qualified for the final with a vault of 4.40 m, but she did not reach that height in the final round and ended the competition in thirteenth place. She set a world junior record mark in the pole vault in August 2005, clearing 4.48 m in Münster.

Spiegelburg reached the final at the 2006 IAAF World Indoor Championships and went on to finish sixth in the pole vault final at the 2006 European Athletics Championships in Gothenburg. She twice achieved marks of 4.56 m on the European circuit that season and came sixth at the end of year 2006 IAAF World Athletics Final. In 2007, she improved her indoor best to 4.50 m and came fifth at the 2007 European Athletics Indoor Championships. She also made her debut at the 2007 World Championships in Athletics, but did not get past the qualifying stage. She ended the year with a personal best of 4.60 m at the 2007 IAAF World Athletics Final.

Her 2008 was somewhat of a breakthrough as she reached 4.70 m for the first time in July 2008 at the Golden Gala. This ranked her joint second among German pole vaulters, behind Annika Becker, and tied with Yvonne Buschbaum. She came seventh at the 2008 Beijing Olympics and equalled her outdoor best at the 2008 IAAF World Athletics Final to take the gold medal.

She claimed her first medal at continental level at the 2009 European Athletics Indoor Championships – she was runner-up on countback to Yuliya Golubchikova but took the silver medal with a German indoor record mark of 4.75 m. She won the bronze medal at the 2009 European Team Championships in June and went on to claim the national pole vault title at the 2009 German Athletics Championships the following month. This gained her a berth at the 2009 World Championships in Athletics, where she cleared 4.65 m – the second highest performance – but ended up in fourth place by merit of countback. She equalled her outdoor best of 4.70 m at the Memorial van Damme, taking third place, but managed only sixth at the 2009 IAAF World Athletics Final.

In the 2010 outdoor season Spiegelburg started with a win at the Qatar Athletic Super Grand Prix – the first stop on the inaugural 2010 IAAF Diamond League. She was narrowly defeated by Svetlana Feofanova at the 2010 European Team Championships, but then beat Lisa Ryzih to claim another national title at the German Championships. She was behind Feofanova at the 2010 European Athletics Championships, but was also ahead of Ryzih, and she left the competition with a European silver medal. She also improved her outdoor best to 4.71 m that season.

She started her 2011 season well with a new national indoor record of 4.76 m at the BW-Bank Meeting in Karlsruhe. At the 2011 European Team Championship she improved her outdoor personal best to 4.75 metres.

At the Diamond League Meeting in Monaco (20 July 2012) she jumped 4,82 metres breaking the German Record.

At the 2012 Summer Olympics in London (XXX Olympic Games) she finished in 4th position with 4.65 metres (6 August 2012).

== See also ==
- Germany all-time top lists - Pole vault
