= Athletics at the 2003 Summer Universiade – Women's pole vault =

The women's pole vault event at the 2003 Summer Universiade was held on 27 August in Daegu, South Korea.

== Results ==
Rank	Athlete	Nationality	3.40	3.60	3.80	3.90	3.95	4.00	4.05	4.10	4.15	4.20	4.25	4.30	4.40	4.45	4.50	4.60	4.70	4.83	Result	Notes
1st place, gold medalist(s)	Tatyana Polnova	Russia	–	–	–	xo	–	–	–	x–	–	o	–	o	o	–	o	o	o	xxx	4.70	GR
2nd place, silver medalist(s)	Anastasiya Ivanova	Russia	–	–	xo	xo	–	o	–	o	–	o	–	xo	o	xxx					4.40	
3rd place, bronze medalist(s)	Nadine Rohr	Switzerland	–	–	o	–	–	o	–	xo	xxo	xo	o	xxx							4.25	NR
4	Elisabete Tavares	Portugal	–	o	o	–	o	–	o	o	xo	o	xxo	xxx							4.25	
5	Fanni Juhász	Hungary	–	–	o	–	–	xo	–	xo	–	xo	xxx								4.20	
6	Agnès Livebardon	France	–	–	o	–	–	xo	–	–	o	–	xxx								4.15	
7	Anna Wielgus	Poland	–	–	xo	–	–	o	–	o	xo	xxx									4.15	
8	Sandra Tavares	Portugal	–	o	o	–	o	–	xo	xxo	xxx										4.10	
9	Rosanna Ditton	Australia	–	–	xo	–	o	–	xxo	–	xxx										4.05	
10	Kelsie Hendry	Canada	–	–	–	o	–	xo	–	xxx											4.00	
11	Anita Tørring	Denmark	–	o	xxo	o	–	xxx													3.90	
12	Arianna Farfaletti	Italy	–	–	xo	–	–	xxx													3.80	
13	Šárka Mládková	Czech Republic	–	–	xxo	xxx															3.80	
14	Cecilia Villar	Mexico	xo	xo	xxx																3.60	
15	Sophie Chiet	New Zealand	o	xxo	xxx																3.60	
15	Alejandra Meza	Mexico	–	xxo	xxx																3.60	
17	Jasmaniah Osman	Malaysia	o	xxx																	3.40	
	Afroditi Skafida	Greece	–	xxx																	NM	
	Katalin Donáth	Hungary	–	–	xxx																NM	
	Roslinda Samsu	Malaysia	–	xxx																	NM	
	Zhang Na	China	–	–	xxx																NM	
