= 2001 European Athletics U23 Championships – Women's pole vault =

The women's pole vault event at the 2001 European Athletics U23 Championships was held in Amsterdam, Netherlands, at Olympisch Stadion on 12 and 14 July.

== Medalists ==
Gold	Monika Pyrek; Poland
Silver	Annika Becker; Germany
Bronze	Carolin Hingst; Germany

== Results ==
=== Final ===
14 July

Rank	Name	Nationality	Attempts						Result	Notes
Rank	Name	Nationality	3.90	4.05	4.20	4.30	4.40	4.45	Result	Notes
1st place, gold medalist(s)	Monika Pyrek	Poland	–	o	o	o	xo	xxx	4.40	CR
2nd place, silver medalist(s)	Annika Becker	Germany	o	o	xxo	o	xxo	xxx	4.40	=CR
3rd place, bronze medalist(s)	Carolin Hingst	Germany	o	o	o	o	xxx		4.30	
4	Martina Strutz	Germany	o	xxo	o	xo	xxx		4.30	
5	Fanni Juhász	Hungary	o	o	xxx				4.05	
6	Michaela Boulová	Czech Republic	xxo	o	xxx				4.05	
7	Mari Mar Sánchez	Spain	o	xo	xxx				4.05	
8	Emilie Bécot	France	xo	xo	xxx				4.05	
9	Aurore Pignot	France	xxo	xo	xxx				4.05	
10	Linda Persson	Sweden	xo	xxx					3.90	
11	Agnès Livebardon	France	xxo	xxx					3.90	
	Teja Melink	Slovenia	xxx						NM	

=== Qualifications ===
12 July
Qualifying 4.25 or 12 best to the Final

==== Group A ====
Rank	Name	Nationality	Result	Notes
1	Michaela Boulová	Czech Republic	4.05	q
2	Teja Melink	Slovenia	4.05	q
3	Emilie Bécot	France	4.05	q
4	Linda Persson	Sweden	4.05	q
5	Martina Strutz	Germany	4.05	q
6	Mari Mar Sánchez	Spain	4.05	q
6	Fanni Juhász	Hungary	4.05	q
8	Anna Wielgus	Poland	3.80	
9	Ana Marisa Vieira	Portugal	3.65	
	Céline Lete	Belgium	NM	

==== Group B ====
Rank	Name	Nationality	Result	Notes
1	Aurore Pignot	France	4.05	q
2	Carolin Hingst	Germany	4.05	q
2	Monika Pyrek	Poland	4.05	q
4	Agnès Livebardon	France	4.05	q
4	Annika Becker	Germany	4.05	q
6	Lucie Palasová	Czech Republic	3.95	
7	Kirsten Belin	Sweden	3.95	
8	Sabine Verbeek	Netherlands	3.95	
9	Elisabete Tavares	Portugal	3.80	
10	Nina Žega	Slovenia	3.65	
11	Anita Tørring	Denmark	3.65	

== Participation ==
According to an unofficial count, 21 athletes from 12 countries participated in the event.

- Belgium (1)
- Czech Republic (2)
- Denmark (1)
- France (3)
- Germany (3)
- Hungary (1)
- Netherlands (1)
- Poland (2)
- Portugal (2)
- Slovenia (2)
- Spain (1)
- Sweden (2)
