= 2003 European Athletics U23 Championships – Women's pole vault =

The women's pole vault event at the 2003 European Athletics U23 Championships was held in Bydgoszcz, Poland, at Zawisza Stadion on 17 and 19 July.

== Medalists ==
| Gold | Yelena Isinbayeva; Russia |
| Silver | Vanessa Boslak; France |
| Bronze | Anna Rogowska; Poland |

== Results ==
=== Final ===
19 July

| Rank | Name | Nationality | Attempts | | | | | | | | | | Result | Notes |
| Rank | Name | Nationality | 3.80 | 4.00 | 4.10 | 4.20 | 4.30 | 4.35 | 4.40 | 4.50 | 4.65 | 4.85 | Result | Notes |
|---|---|---|---|---|---|---|---|---|---|---|---|---|---|---|
| 1st place, gold medalist(s) | Yelena Isinbayeva | Russia | – | – | – | – | xo | – | xo | o | o | x | 4.65 | CR |
| 2nd place, silver medalist(s) | Vanessa Boslak | France | – | – | o | – | o | – | xo | xxx | | | 4.40 | |
| 3rd place, bronze medalist(s) | Anna Rogowska | Poland | – | xo | – | o | o | xo | xxx | | | | 4.35 | |
| 4 | Nataliya Kushch | Ukraine | – | xxo | – | o | o | – | xxx | | | | 4.30 | |
| 5 | Kirsten Belin | Sweden | – | – | o | o | xxx | | | | | | 4.20 | |
| 6 | Élise Genevrier | France | o | o | o | xxx | | | | | | | 4.10 | |
| 7 | Linda Persson | Sweden | o | xxo | o | xxx | | | | | | | 4.10 | |
| 8 | Afroditi Skafida | Greece | – | – | xo | xxx | | | | | | | 4.10 | |
| 9 | Martina Strutz | Germany | o | xxx | | | | | | | | | 3.80 | |
| 9 | Sandra-Hélèna Tavares | Portugal | o | xxx | | | | | | | | | 3.80 | |
| | Ana Rebenaque | Spain | xxx | | | | | | | | | | NM | |
| | Fanni Juhász | Hungary | – | xxx | | | | | | | | | NM | |

v

=== Qualifications ===
17 July
Qualifying 4.42 or 12 best to the Final

==== Group A ====
| Rank | Name | Nationality | Result | Notes |
|---|---|---|---|---|
| 1 | Afroditi Skafida | Greece | 4.15 | q |
| 1 | Kirsten Belin | Sweden | 4.15 | q |
| 1 | Nataliya Kushch | Ukraine | 4.15 | q |
| 4 | Ana Rebenaque | Spain | 4.15 | q |
| 5 | Élise Genevrier | France | 4.05 | q |
| 5 | Sandra-Hélèna Tavares | Portugal | 4.05 | q |
| 7 | Anne Latvala | Finland | 4.05 | |
| 8 | Michaela Boulová | Czech Republic | 3.95 | |
| 9 | Sarah Semeraro | Italy | 3.95 | |
| 10 | Róża Kasprzak | Poland | 3.80 | |
| 10 | Maria Rendin | Sweden | 3.80 | |
| | Zoë Brown | Great Britain | NM | |

==== Group B ====
| Rank | Name | Nationality | Result | Notes |
|---|---|---|---|---|
| 1 | Yelena Isinbayeva | Russia | 4.20 | q |
| 2 | Anna Rogowska | Poland | 4.20 | q |
| 3 | Vanessa Boslak | France | 4.15 | q |
| 4 | Linda Persson | Sweden | 4.15 | q |
| 5 | Fanni Juhász | Hungary | 4.05 | q |
| 6 | Martina Strutz | Germany | 4.05 | q |
| 7 | Agnieszka Wrona | Poland | 4.05 | |
| 8 | Yulia Taratynava | Belarus | 4.05 | |
| 9 | Pamela Azzolini | Italy | 3.95 | |
| 10 | Paulina Sigg | Finland | 3.80 | |
| 11 | Saara Laaksonen | Finland | 3.60 | |
| 12 | Zhanna Barrer | Israel | 3.60 | |

== Participation ==
According to an unofficial count, 24 athletes from 16 countries participated in the event.

- Belarus (1)
- Czech Republic (1)
- Finland (3)
- France (2)
- Germany (1)
- Great Britain (1)
- Greece (1)
- Hungary (1)
- Israel (1)
- Italy (2)
- Poland (3)
- Portugal (1)
- Russia (1)
- Spain (1)
- Sweden (3)
- Ukraine (1)
