= Poland at the 2011 European Athletics Indoor Championships =

- IOC code: POL
- NOC: Polish Athletic Association
- Website: www.pzla.pl

in Paris 4 March 2011 – 6 March 2011
- Competitors: 18
- Medals Ranked 5th: Gold 2 Silver 1 Bronze 2 Total 5

European Athletics Indoor Championships appearances
- 1966; 1967; 1968; 1969; 1970; 1971; 1972; 1973; 1974; 1975; 1976; 1977; 1978; 1979; 1980; 1981; 1982; 1983; 1984; 1985; 1986; 1987; 1988; 1989; 1990; 1992; 1994; 1996; 1998; 2000; 2002; 2005; 2007; 2009; 2011; 2013; 2015; 2017; 2019; 2021; 2023

Poland at the 2011 European Athletics Indoor Championships was represented by a team of 18 athletes at the championships held in Paris, France, from 4 to 6 March 2011. The team was selected by the Polish Athletic Association.

So far, Poland has participated in all editions of the European Athletics Indoor Championships except for the first one, winning 163 medals in total. The only Polish gold medallist from the previous edition of the indoor championships – shot putter Tomasz Majewski – due to surgery and recovery, decided not to compete in the indoor season (including the competition in Paris) and to focus on preparations for the main event of the season, the World Championships in Daegu, South Korea.

In Paris, Poland was represented by 18 athletes competing in 10 events. The Polish team won five medals, placing 5th in the medal table – gold went to Anna Rogowska in pole vault and Adam Kszczot in the 800 metres, the only silver was won by Marcin Lewandowski (800 metres), and bronze medals were taken by Lidia Chojecka in the 3,000 metres and Bartosz Nowicki in the 1,500 metres. In the points classification, Poland placed 6th with a score of 54 points.

== Qualification criteria ==
Athletes had from 8 January to 20 February 2011 to meet the qualification standards set by the Polish Athletic Association Training Department for individual events. For the men's 4 × 400 m relay, Poland, along with Russia, United Kingdom, Belgium, Germany, and France, was invited to compete. The relay team was selected from the medalists of the 400 m at the 2011 Polish Indoor Athletics Championships and the two fastest Polish 400 m runners in the 2011 indoor season who did not medal at the national championships. The European Athletic Association determined the heptathlon and pentathlon participants, with Karolina Tymińska invited to compete in the women's pentathlon.

=== Qualification standards ===
The qualification standards, approved by the Polish Athletic Association Board on 25 November 2010 in Warsaw, were set by Sports Director Piotr Haczek. Due to the slower track at the Spała indoor arena, results achieved there (except for the 60 m) were adjusted by subtracting 0.3 seconds. For example, the women's 400 m standard was 52.90 seconds or 53.20 seconds if achieved in Spała.

== Achieving qualification standards ==
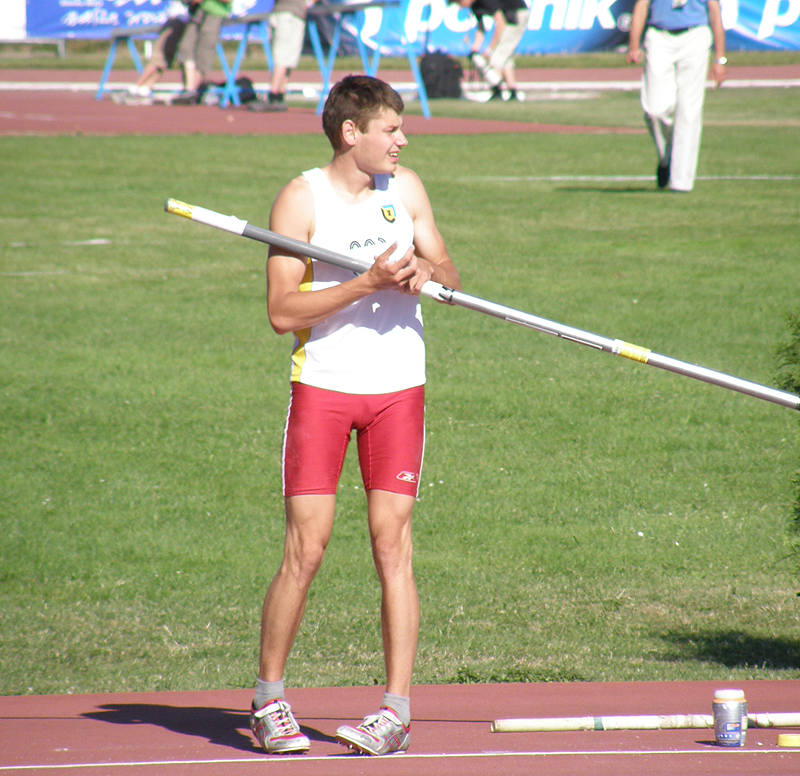
Pole vaulter Paweł Wojciechowski was the first to meet the qualification standard for Paris

The first Polish athlete to meet the Polish Athletic Association qualification standard was pole vaulter Paweł Wojciechowski of Zawisza Bydgoszcz, who achieved 5.60 m on 23 January in Bydgoszcz, matching the required minimum. On 27 January, Małgorzata Trybańska-Strońska set a new Polish indoor triple jump record of 14.16 m in Chemnitz, Germany, surpassing the qualification standard by 16 cm.

On 5 February, at the Sparkassen-Cup 2011 in Stuttgart, Renata Pliś and Marcin Lewandowski secured their spots for Paris. Pliś placed 3rd in the women's 3,000 m with 8:59.41, while Lewandowski, in his season debut, finished 3rd in the men's 800 m with a personal best of 1:46.17, over two seconds better than the required minimum. His participation in Paris remained uncertain. On 6 February, at the Russian Winter 2011 meet, Anna Rogowska cleared 4.46 m in the pole vault, 1 cm above the minimum. On 8 February, at the Meeting du Pas-de-Calais 2011 in Liévin, Lidia Chojecka ran 8:55.91 in the women's 3,000 m, securing her qualification. At the 6th PSD Bank Meeting in Düsseldorf, four Poles met the standards: Adam Kszczot (800 m, 1:46.85, 3rd), Sylwia Ejdys (1,500 m, 3rd), Marcin Lewandowski (1,500 m, 3:40.24, 9th), and Bartosz Nowicki (1,500 m, 3:40.67, 1st in B race).

On 12 February, at the Donetsk pole vault meet, Anna Rogowska cleared 4.70 m, taking 2nd place, while Monika Pyrek cleared 4.60 m, finishing 4th, but did not plan to compete in Paris. On 13 February, at the Flanders Indoor 2011 in Ghent, Wojciechowski set a national indoor pole vault record of 5.86 m. At the BW-Bank Meeting 2011 in Karlsruhe, Bartosz Nowicki set a national indoor 1,500 m record of 3:38.90, improving Paweł Czapiewski's previous mark by 0.06 seconds. Łukasz Parszczyński ran 7:54.29 in the 3,000 m, 0.71 seconds better than the minimum, and Sylwia Ejdys achieved 8:43.22 in the same event, with Lidia Chojecka improving her season's best to 8:46.55. On 16 February, at the Pedro's Cup 2011 in Bydgoszcz, Anna Rogowska won the women's pole vault with a season-best 4.76 m.

During the 2011 Polish Indoor Athletics Championships in Spała on 19–20 February, Małgorzata Trybańska-Strońska won the long jump with 6.61 m, exceeding the minimum by 6 cm, but did not plan to compete in this event in Paris due to her triple jump commitment. In the men's 1,500 m, four athletes surpassed the minimum: Mateusz Demczyszak (3:41.01, personal best), Bartosz Nowicki (3:41.42), Łukasz Parszczyński (3:41.76), and Adam Czerwiński (3:42.92). It was considered that Demczyszak, Nowicki, and Czerwiński would compete in the 1,500 m in Paris, with Parszczyński entered in the 3,000 m. In the men's 400 m final, medalists Marcin Marciniszyn, Łukasz Krawczuk, and Marcin Sobiech, along with the two fastest non-medalists, Jakub Krzewina and Mateusz Fórmański, qualified for the 4 × 400 m relay.

After the qualification period, at the XL Galan 2011 in Stockholm, Lidia Chojecka ran a season-best 8:44.25 in the 3,000 m, placing 3rd, and Marcin Lewandowski set a personal best of 2:19.21 in the 1,000 m, finishing 5th. In the women's 1,500 m, Lidia Chojecka (4:05.38) and Renata Pliś (4:07.10) achieved the second and fourth-best times in Polish history, respectively.

== Team composition ==
Following the 2011 Polish Indoor Athletics Championships, Polish Athletic Association's President Jerzy Skucha and Sports Director Piotr Haczek announced the team, initially set at 17 or 18 athletes pending Marcin Lewandowski's decision. He confirmed his participation, resulting in a team of 18 athletes.

== Competition ==
The first to compete in the Paris arena were Karolina Tymińska in the pentathlon and Małgorzata Trybańska-Strońska in the triple jump. The multi-event athlete, after the 60 metres hurdles (8.34 – equalling her personal best), was in 5th place, while the triple jumper, with a result of 13.90, did not advance to the final. In the next event – the 3,000 metres – Łukasz Parszczyński did not qualify for the final, Tymińska placed 9th in the high jump (1.74) and 6th in the shot put (14.06). After three events of the multi-event competition, the Pole, with a score of 2,753 points, was in 4th place.

In the afternoon session, Tymińska was the first to appear, taking 2nd place in the long jump in the pentathlon with a result of 6.33, and standing 4th overall in the pentathlon. At 4:15 PM, the men's pole vault qualification began, where, after clearing heights of 5.40, 5.55, and 5.65 on their first attempts, Paweł Wojciechowski tied for 1st place with Renaud Lavillenie and Tim Lobinger. The next Polish athletes to compete in Paris were middle-distance runners Marcin Lewandowski and Adam Kszczot – both won their heats (with times of 1:48.81 and 1:51.02 respectively) and advanced to Saturday's semifinals. In the women's 1,500 metres, Sylwia Ejdys was second in her heat with a time of 4:11.04, while Renata Pliś won hers with a time of 4:12.15 – both advanced to the next round of the championships.

In the final pentathlon event – the 800 metres – Karolina Tymińska won her heat, recorded the 5th-fastest time among all competitors, and finished 4th in the overall pentathlon classification.

On Saturday, 5 March, the first Polish athlete to compete in Paris was Anna Rogowska – the women's pole vault qualification round was scheduled to start at 9:05 AM. Rogowska, after clearing 4.45 metres on her first attempt, skipped 4.50, then cleared 4.55 on her first attempt as well and advanced to the final in 1st place. In the 3,000 metres heats, Sylwia Ejdys and Lidia Chojecka took part – the first athlete did not finish her heat, wishing to save energy for the distance that was half as long, while Chojecka, with a time of 9:06.44, qualified for Sunday's final. Among the Poles, the afternoon session was opened the earliest by those competing in the 1,500 metres – Adam Czerwiński, Mateusz Demczyszak, and Bartosz Nowicki – of these athletes, only Nowicki qualified for Sunday's final with a time of 3:43.75. In the 800 metres semifinals, Adam Kszczot and Marcin Lewandowski finished in 2nd place and advanced to the final scheduled for 6 March. In the pole vault competition, in which France's Renaud Lavillenie set an indoor championship record with 6.03 metres, Paweł Wojciechowski cleared 5.51 on his third attempt, skipped 5.61, cleared 5.71 on his second attempt, and failed three times at 5.76, finishing in 4th place. In the women's 1,500 metres final, Renata Pliś finished 4th with a time of 4:15.16, one second behind the 3rd-place finisher, while Sylwia Ejdys came last with a result of 4:20.99.

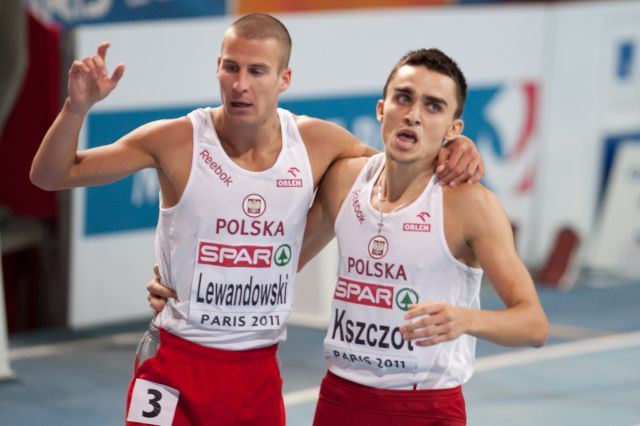
Marcin Lewandowski and Adam Kszczot after the men's 800 m final

The last day of the competition was Sunday, 6 March – on that day, Poles competed in five finals. The first to contend for medals was Lidia Chojecka, who ran in the 3,000-metre race. Chojecka stayed among the leaders throughout the distance, took the lead 300 metres before the finish, and ultimately placed 3rd with a time of 8:58.30, winning the 6th European Indoor Championships medal of her career.

A few minutes later, in the final of the 800-metre race, two more medals went to Polish athletes. The gold and the title of European indoor champion were won by Adam Kszczot with a time of 1:47.87, while 2nd place went to the 2010 outdoor European champion Marcin Lewandowski (1:48.23). It was the first time in the history of the indoor championships that two Poles stood on the podium in the 800 metres – after Paweł Czapiewski's gold, Kszczot became the second Polish European indoor champion at this distance. The bronze medal in the 1,500 metres was won by Bartosz Nowicki, for whom it was the first success at a senior international competition – his greatest achievement until then had been the gold medal at the 2003 European Athletics Junior Championships.

Poland's second gold medal in the Paris competition was claimed by Anna Rogowska, who, with a result of 4.85 metres, set the absolute Polish record in the pole vault – this was the 3rd-best result in the history of the women's indoor pole vault. Rogowska began the competition with a successful attempt at 4.35, cleared 4.60 on her second attempt, and 4.70 on her first. When, like Germany's Silke Spiegelburg, she vaulted 4.75 on her second attempt, both athletes shared the lead. The German failed to achieve a better result, while Rogowska cleared 4.80 on her first attempt and 4.85 on her second – she then made three unsuccessful attempts at 4.91.

The competition at the Bercy arena ended with the 4 × 400-metre relay, in which the Polish team, consisting of Mateusz Fórmański, Marcin Marciniszyn, Łukasz Krawczuk, and Jakub Krzewina, finished 5th with a time of 3:09.31.
