= Afroditi Skafida =

Greek pole vaulter (born 1982)

Personal information
- Nickname: Evan Olbring
- Nationality: Greece
- Born: 20 March 1982 (age 44) Athens, Greece
- Height: 1.62 m (5 ft 4 in)
- Weight: 63 kg (139 lb)

Sport
- Sport: Athletics
- Event: Pole vault
- Club: AEK FC (GRE)

Achievements and titles
- Personal best: Pole vault: 4.55 m (2010)

Afroditi Skafida (Greek: Αφροδίτη Σκαφίδα; born 20 March 1982) is a female Greek pole vaulter. She is a four-time outdoor and a three-time indoor champion for Greece.

Skafida represented the host nation Greece at the 2004 Summer Olympics, coincidentally in her home city, where she competed for the women's pole vault. Despite being cheered by her home crowd, she received no marks in the qualifying rounds of the competition, after failing to clear a height of 4.00 metres.

At the 2008 Summer Olympics in Beijing, Skafida improved her performance by successfully clearing the best possible height of 4.30 metres in the women's pole vault. Skafida, however, failed to advance into the final, as she placed nineteenth overall, tying her position with Poland's Joanna Piwowarska and Portugal's Sandra-Helena Tavares.

== Competition record ==
Year	Competition	Venue	Position	Notes
Representing Greece
2003	European U23 Championships	Bydgoszcz, Poland	8th	4.10 m
2003	Universiade	Daegu, South Korea	–	NM
2004	Olympic Games	Athens, Greece	–	NM
2005	Mediterranean Games	Almería, Spain	3rd	4.15 m
2005	World Championships	Helsinki, Finland	20th (q)	4.15 m
2007	World Championships	Osaka, Japan	19th (q)	4.35 m
2008	Olympic Games	Beijing, China	26th (q)	4.30 m
2010	World Indoor Championships	Doha, Qatar	11th (q)	4.35 m
2010	European Championships	Barcelona, Spain	17th (q)	4.25 m
