= 2006 IAAF World Indoor Championships – Women's pole vault =

The women's pole vault event at the 2006 IAAF World Indoor Championships was held on March 10 and 11.

== Medalists ==
Gold	Silver	Bronze
Yelena Isinbayeva; Russia	Anna Rogowska; Poland	Svetlana Feofanova; Russia

== Results ==
=== Qualification ===
The eight best performers (q) advanced to the final.

Rank	Athlete	Nationality	4.15	4.25	4.35	4.45	4.50	Result	Notes
1.	Svetlana Feofanova	Russia	–	–	xo	o	o	4.50	q
2.	Elena Isinbaeva	Russia	–	–	–	–	xo	4.50	q
3.	Naroa Agirre	Spain	o	o	o	xo	xo	4.50	q, NR
3.	Vanessa Boslak	France	o	–	o	xo	xo	4.50	q
3.	Monika Pyrek	Poland	–	–	xo	–	xo	4.50	q
3.	Anna Rogowska	Poland	–	–	xo	–	xo	4.50	q
7.	Silke Spiegelburg	Germany	o	o	o	o	xxx	4.45	q, PB
8.	Kellie Suttle	United States	–	xo	o	o	xxx	4.45	q
9.	Martina Strutz	Germany	o	o	o	xo	xxx	4.45	
10.	Dana Ellis	Canada	–	o	o	xxx		4.35	
10.	Jillian Schwartz	United States	–	o	o	xxx		4.35	
12.	Krisztina Molnár	Hungary	xxo	o	o	xxx		4.35	
13.	Natalya Kushch	Ukraine	o	o	xo	xxx		4.35	
13.	Hanna-Mia Persson	Sweden	o	o	xo	xxx		4.35	
15.	Fabiana Murer	Brazil	o	o	xxo	xxx		4.35	
16.	Kirsten Belin	Sweden	o	o	xxx			4.25	
16.	Pavla Rybová	Czech Republic	–	o	xxx			4.25	
18.	Zhao Yingying	China	xxo	xxo	xxx			4.25	SB
	Yang Jing	China	xxx					NM	

=== Final ===
Rank	Athlete	Nationality	4.30	4.40	4.45	4.50	4.55	4.60	4.65	4.70	4.75	4.80	4.85	4.93	Result	Notes
1st place, gold medalist(s)	Elena Isinbaeva	Russia	–	–	–	–	–	o	–	–	o	o	–	xxx	4.80	
2nd place, silver medalist(s)	Anna Rogowska	Poland	–	o	–	–	o	–	o	xo	xo	–	xxx		4.75	
3rd place, bronze medalist(s)	Svetlana Feofanova	Russia	–	o	–	o	–	xo	–	o	xx–	x			4.70	SB
4	Monika Pyrek	Poland	–	o	–	–	xo	–	o	xxx					4.65	
5	Vanessa Boslak	France	xo	–	xo	–	o	–	o	xxx					4.65	NR
6	Naroa Agirre	Spain	o	xo	o	xo	xxx								4.50	NR
7	Kellie Suttle	United States	o	xo	–	xxx									4.40	
8	Silke Spiegelburg	Germany	o	xxx											4.30	
