= Martina Strutz =

German pole vaulter

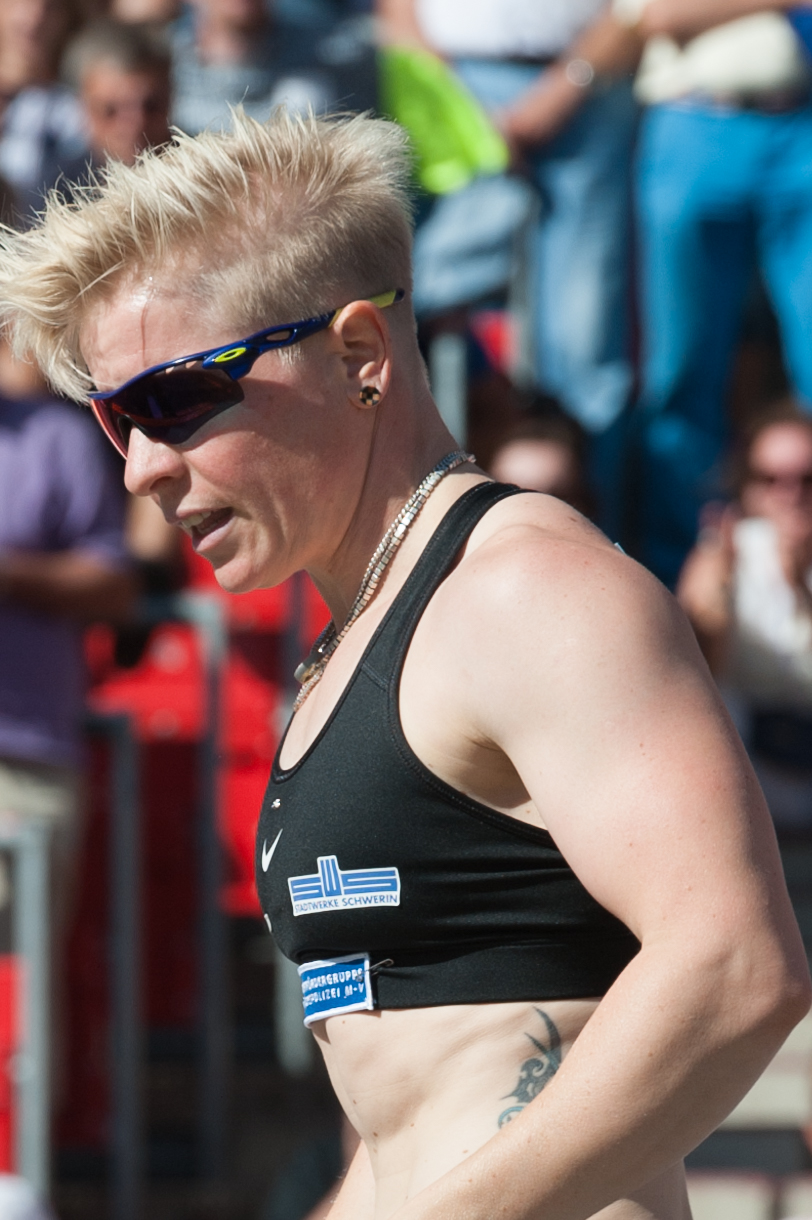

Personal information
- Full name: Martina Strutz
- Nationality: German
- Born: 4 November 1981 (age 44) Schwerin, East Germany
- Height: 1.60 m (5 ft 3 in)
- Weight: 53 kg (117 lb)

Sport
- Event: Pole vault
Medal record
Representing Germany
World Championships
Silver medal – second place	2011 Daegu	Pole vault
European Championships
Silver medal – second place	2012 Helsinki	Pole vault

Martina Strutz (born 4 November 1981 in Schwerin) is a German pole vaulter.

== Biography ==
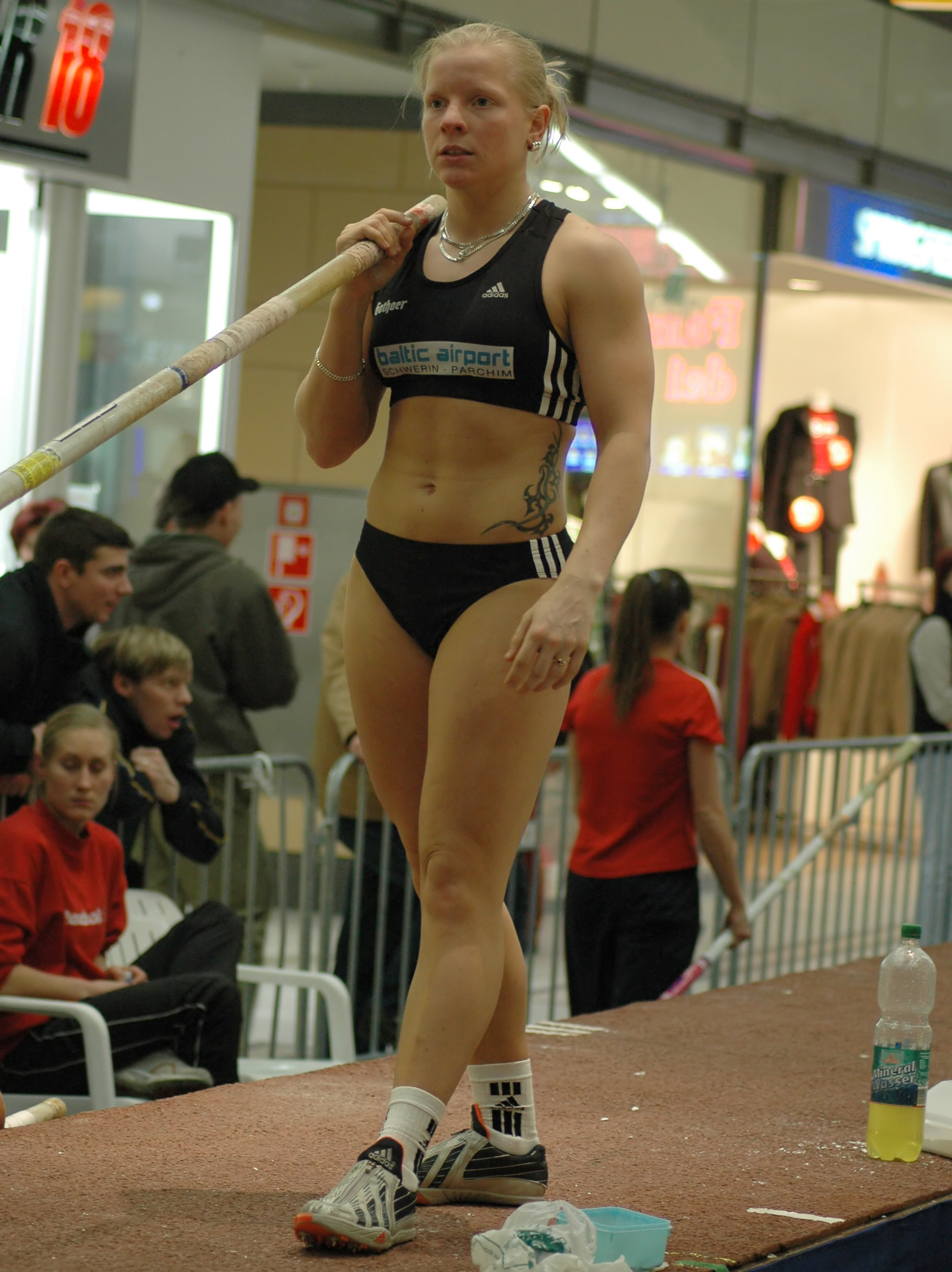

She finished fifth in women pole Vault at the London 2012 Summer Olympics. She finished fifth at the 2000 World Junior Championships in Santiago, fifth at the 2006 European Athletics Championships in Gothenburg and fourth at the 2006 IAAF World Cup in Athens. Her personal best is 4.80 metres, achieved in August 2011 in Daegu.

== Competition record ==
Year	Competition	Venue	Position	Notes
Representing Germany
2000	World Junior Championships	Santiago, Chile	5th	4.00 m
2001	European U23 Championships	Amsterdam, Netherlands	4th	4.30 m
2003	European U23 Championships	Bydgoszcz, Poland	9th	3.80 m
2005	European Indoor Championships	Madrid, Spain	12th (q)	4.30 m
2006	World Indoor Championships	Moscow, Russia	9th (q)	4.45 m
2006	European Championships	Gothenburg, Sweden	5th	4.50 m
2011	World Championships	Daegu, South Korea	2nd	4.80 m
2012	European Championships	Helsinki, Finland	2nd	4.60 m
2012	Olympic Games	London, United Kingdom	5th	4.55 m
2015	European Indoor Championships	Prague, Czech Republic	11th (q)	4.45 m
2015	World Championships	Beijing, China	8th	4.60 m
2016	European Championships	Amsterdam, Netherlands	10th	4.45 m
2016	Olympic Games	Rio de Janeiro, Brazil	9th	4.60 m

== Personal life ==
In 2015, Strutz married her partner Steffi.

== See also ==
- Germany all-time top lists - Pole vault
