= Carolin Hingst =

German pole vaulter (born 1980)

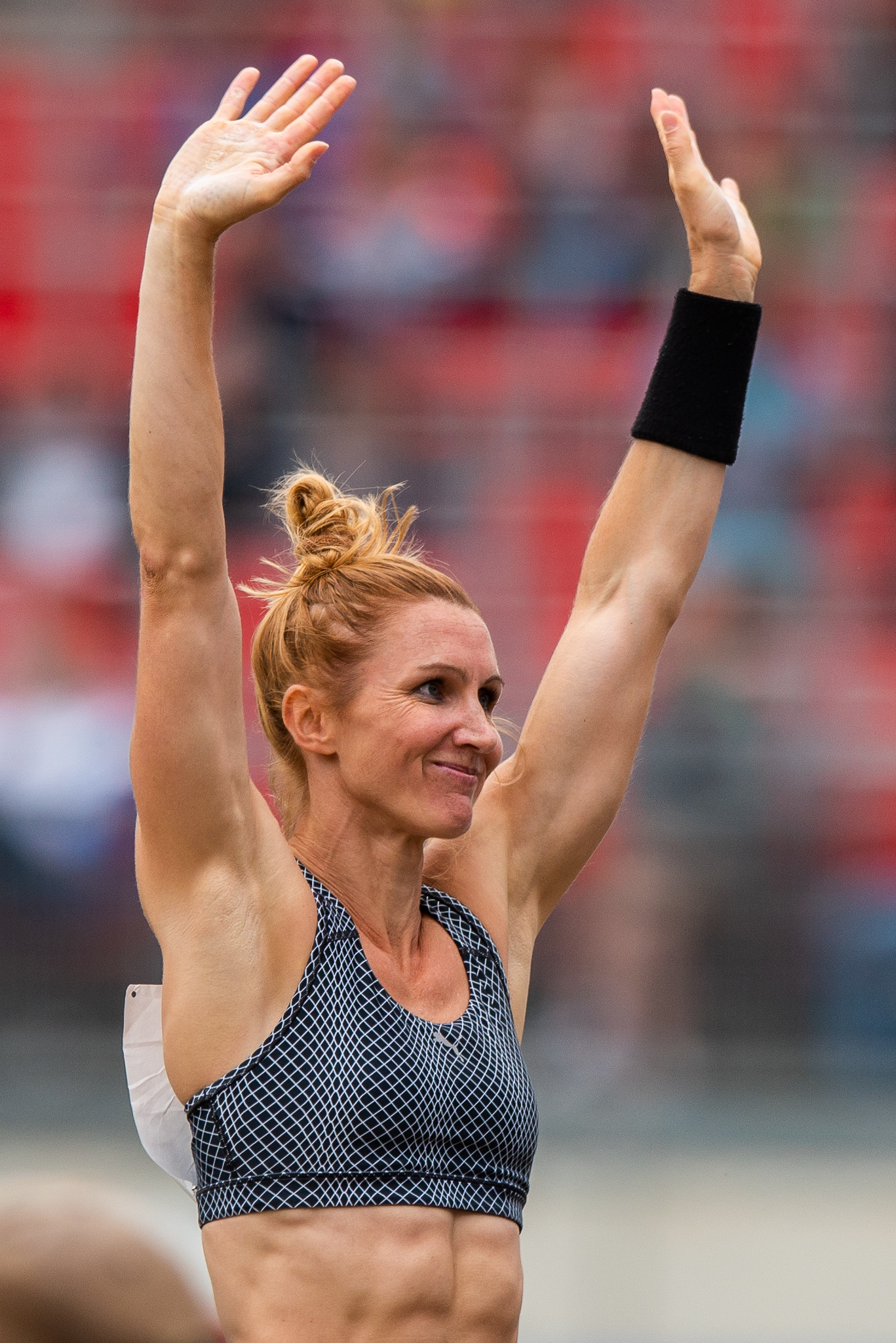
- Hingst in 2018

Personal information
- Born: 18 September 1980 (age 45) Donauwörth, West Germany
- Height: 1.70 m (5 ft 7 in)
- Weight: 58 kg (128 lb)

Sport
- Country: Germany
- Sport: Athletics
- Event: Pole Vault

Achievements and titles
- Personal bests: Pole vault outdoor: 4.72 m (15 ft 6 in) (2010); Pole vault indoor: 4.70 m (15 ft 5 in) (2007)

Carolin Tamara Hingst (born 18 September 1980 in Donauwörth) is a German pole vaulter.

She finished 10th at the 2001 World Championships in Edmonton, fourth at the 2005 European Indoor Athletics Championships in Madrid and 10th at the 2005 World Championships in Helsinki.

Her personal best is 4.72 metres, achieved in July 2010 in Biberach an der Riß. This ranks her fourth among German pole vaulters.

== Competition record ==
Year	Competition	Venue	Position	Notes
Representing Germany
2001	European U23 Championships	Amsterdam, Netherlands	3rd	4.30 m
2001	World Championships	Edmonton, Canada	10th	4.25 m
2002	European Championships	Munich, Germany	13th (q)	4.30 m
2003	World Championships	Paris, France	15th (q)	4.25 m
2004	World Indoor Championships	Budapest, Hungary	9th (q)	4.30 m
2004	Olympic Games	Athens, Greece	22nd (q)	4.30 m
2005	European Indoor Championships	Madrid, Spain	4th	4.65 m
2005	World Championships	Helsinki, Finland	10th	4.35 m
2007	European Indoor Championships	Birmingham, United Kingdom	10th (q)	4.40 m
2007	World Championships	Osaka, Japan	16th (q)	4.35 m
2008	Olympic Games	Beijing, China	6th	4.65 m
2010	World Indoor Championships	Doha, Qatar	–	NM
2010	European Championships	Barcelona, Spain	11th	4.35 m
2013	World Championships	Moscow, Russia	17th (q)	4.45 m
2014	European Championships	Zürich, Switzerland	10th	4.35 m
2018	European Championships	Berlin, Germany	9th	4.30 m

== See also ==
- Germany all-time top lists - Pole vault
