= 2007 World Championships in Athletics – Women's pole vault =

The women's pole vault event at the 2007 World Championships in Athletics took place on August 26, 2007 (qualification) and August 28, 2007 (final) at the Nagai Stadium in Osaka, Japan.

== Medallists ==
Gold	Yelena Isinbayeva; Russia (RUS)
Silver	Katerina Badurová; Czech Republic (CZE)
Bronze	Svetlana Feofanova; Russia (RUS)

== Records ==
World Record	Yelena Isinbayeva (RUS)	5.01	Helsinki, Finland	12 August 2005
Championship Record	Yelena Isinbayeva (RUS)	5.01	Helsinki, Finland	12 August 2005

== Results ==
=== Final ===
Place	Athlete	Nation	Mark	Notes
1st place, gold medalist(s)	Yelena Isinbaeva	Russia	4.80	
2nd place, silver medalist(s)	Katerina Badurová	Czech Republic	4.75	NR
3rd place, bronze medalist(s)	Svetlana Feofanova	Russia	4.75	
4	Monika Pyrek	Poland	4.75	PB=
5	Vanessa Boslak	France	4.70	NR
6	Fabiana Murer	Brazil	4.65	SB
6	Yuliya Golubchikova	Russia	4.65	
8	Anna Rogowska	Poland	4.60	SB
9	Tatyana Polnova	Russia	4.60	
10	Jennifer Stuczynski	United States	4.50	
11	Kym Howe	Australia	4.50	
—	Silke Spiegelburg	Germany	NM	

=== Qualification ===
==== Group A ====
Place	Athlete	Nation	Mark	Notes
1	Jennifer Stuczynski	United States	4.55	Q
2	Katerina Badurová	Czech Republic	4.55	Q
3	Yuliya Golubchikova	Russia	4.55	Q
4	Svetlana Feofanova	Russia	4.55	Q
5	Fabiana Murer	Brazil	4.55	Q
6	Anna Rogowska	Poland	4.55	Q SB
7	Naroa Agirre	Spain	4.50	NR
8	Jillian Schwartz	United States	4.50	SB
9	Julia Hütter	Germany	4.45	
10	Carolin Hingst	Germany	4.35	
11	Afroditi Skafida	Greece	4.35	
11	Minna Nikkanen	Finland	4.35	NR
13	Zhang Yingning	China	4.35	
14	Takayo Kondo	Japan	4.35	PB
15	Alejandra García	Argentina	4.20	
16	Alana Boyd	Australia	4.20	

==== Group B ====
Place	Athlete	Nation	Mark	Notes
1	Tatyana Polnova	Russia	4.55	Q
1	Yelena Isinbaeva	Russia	4.55	Q
1	Monika Pyrek	Poland	4.55	Q
4	Kym Howe	Australia	4.55	Q
5	Vanessa Boslak	France	4.55	Q
6	Silke Spiegelburg	Germany	4.55	Q
7	Gao Shuying	China	4.50	
8	Niki McEwen	United States	4.35	
9	Pavla Hamácková-Rybova	Czech Republic	4.35	
9	Thórey Edda Elisdóttir	Iceland	4.35	
11	Roslinda Samsu	Malaysia	4.35	SB
12	Hanna-Mia Persson	Sweden	4.20	
13	Kate Dennison	Great Britain & N.I.	4.20	
14	Anna Katharina Schmid	Switzerland	4.20	
15	Vicky Parnov	Australia	4.05	
16	Joana Costa	Brazil	4.05	
17	Elisabete Tavares	Portugal	4.05	
