= Naroa Agirre =

Spanish pole vaulter and actress

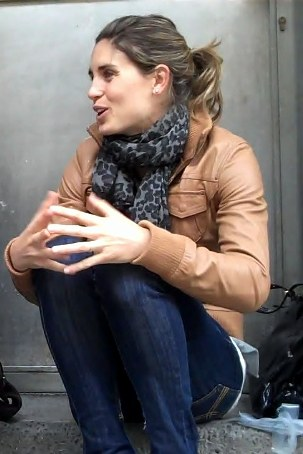
- Agirre in 2010

Personal information
- Full name: Naroa Agirre Camio
- Born: 15 May 1979 (age 47) San Sebastián, Basque Country, Spain
Medal record
Women's athletics
Representing Spain
Mediterranean Games
| Silver medal – second place | 2013 Mersin | Pole vault |

Naroa Agirre Camio (born 15 May 1979 in San Sebastián) is a female pole vaulter from Spain. Her current personal best is 4.50 metres, achieved in May 2006 in Saulheim. She has 4.56 metres on the indoor track, from February 2007 in Seville. She is the national record holder for the sport.

Agirre won her fifth national title in the pole vault in Barcelona in 2009.

She also works as an actress, appearing in Basque TV show Goenkale.

== Achievements ==
| Year | Competition | Venue | Position | Notes |
Representing Spain
| 2001 | Mediterranean Games | Tunis, Tunisia | 5th | 3.80 m |
| 2002 | European Championships | Munich, Germany | 10th | 4.30 m |
| 2003 | World Indoor Championships | Birmingham, United Kingdom | 12th (q) | 4.10 m |
| 2003 | World Championships | Paris, France | 13th (q) | 4.25 m |
| 2004 | World Indoor Championships | Budapest, Hungary | 14th (q) | 4.20 m |
| 2004 | Ibero-American Championships | Huelva, Spain | 1st | 4.30 m |
| 2004 | Olympic Games | Athens, Greece | 6th | 4.40 m |
| 2005 | European Indoor Championships | Madrid, Spain | 10th (q) | 4.30 m |
| 2005 | World Championships | Helsinki, Finland | 9th | 4.35 m |
| 2006 | World Indoor Championships | Moscow, Russia | 6th | 4.50 m |
| 2006 | European Championships | Gothenburg, Sweden | 7th | 4.45 m |
| 2007 | European Indoor Championships | Birmingham, United Kingdom | 13th (q) | 4.40 m |
| 2007 | World Championships | Osaka, Japan | 13th (q) | 4.50 m |
| 2008 | World Indoor Championships | Valencia, Spain | 9th | 4.40 m |
| 2008 | Olympic Games | Beijing, China | 13th (q) | 4.40 m |
| 2009 | World Championships | Berlin, Germany | 21st (q) | 4.40 m |
| 2010 | Ibero-American Championships | San Fernando, Spain | 4th | 4.20 m |
| 2010 | European Championships | Barcelona, Spain | 14th (q) | 4.25 m |
| 2011 | European Indoor Championships | Paris, France | 15th (q) | 4.15 m |
| 2012 | European Championships | Helsinki, Finland | 25th (q) | 4.05 m |
| 2013 | Mediterranean Games | Mersin, Turkey | 2nd | 4.40 m |
| 2014 | European Championships | Zürich, Switzerland | 16th (q) | 4.35 m |
| 2015 | World Championships | Beijing, China | 16th (q) | 4.45 m |
