= Anna Rogowska =

Polish pole vaulter

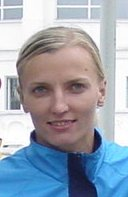
- Anna Rogowska in 2005

Personal information
- Nationality: Poland
- Born: 21 May 1981 (age 45) Gdynia, Poland
- Height: 1.71 m (5 ft 7 1/2 in)
- Weight: 57 kg (126 lb) (2012)

Sport
- Sport: Athletics
- Event: Pole vault
- Club: SKLA Sopot
Medal record
Women's athletics
Representing Poland
Event	1st	2nd	3rd
Olympic Games	0	0	1
World Championships	1	2	1
World Indoor Championships	0	1	1
European Indoor Championships	1	2	1
European U23 Championships	0	0	1
World Athletics Final	0	0	1
Total	2	5	6
Olympic Games
Bronze medal – third place	2004 Athens	Pole vault
World Championships
Gold medal – first place	2009 Berlin	Pole vault
World Indoor Championships
Silver medal – second place	2006 Moscow	Pole vault
Bronze medal – third place	2010 Doha	Pole vault
European Indoor Championships
Gold medal – first place	2011 Paris	Pole vault
Silver medal – second place	2005 Madrid	Pole vault
Silver medal – second place	2013 Gothenburg	Pole vault
Bronze medal – third place	2007 Birmingham	Pole vault
European Team Championships
Gold medal – first place	2011 Stockholm	Pole vault
Bronze medal – third place	2013 Gateshead	Pole vault

Anna Rogowska (born 21 May 1981) is a retired Polish athlete who specialised in the pole vault. She became the World Champion in 2009 in Berlin.

== Career ==
Born in Gdynia, she won the bronze medal at the 2004 Olympics, narrowly beating Monika Pyrek, another Polish pole vaulter born in Gdynia. Early 2005 brought success as she won the silver medal in the European Indoor Championships. On July 22, 2005, in London, she achieved a personal best with 4.80 m, which was also the Polish record. Minutes later she saw Yelena Isinbayeva become the first woman to clear 5.00 m.

Rogowska was among the contenders for a medal in the 2005 World Championships. She finished sixth, however, jumping only 4.35 m under challenging weather conditions.

On August 26, 2005, she achieved another personal best with 4.83 m (new Polish record). This was on the Memorial van Damme. She also holds the Polish indoor record of 4.85 m, set on 6 March 2011.

She announced her retirement from the sport on 27 February 2015.

For her sport achievements, she received:
Golden Cross of Merit in 2004.
Knight's Cross of the Order of Polonia Restituta (5th Class) in 2009.

== Competition record ==
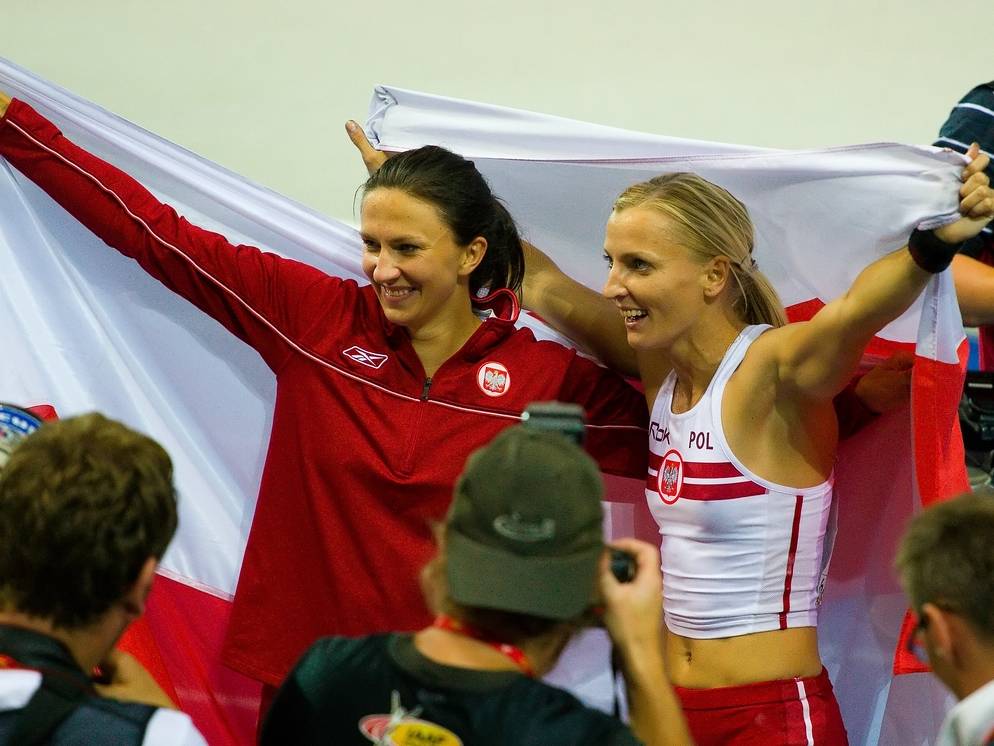
Rogowska (right) after winning the gold at the 2009 World Championships.

Year	Competition	Venue	Position	Notes
Representing Poland
2002	European Indoor Championships	Vienna, Austria	12th (q)	4.20 m
2002	European Championships	Munich, Germany	7th	4.30 m
2003	World Indoor Championships	Budapest, Hungary	6th	4.35 m
2003	European U23 Championships	Bydgoszcz, Poland	3rd	4.35 m
2003	World Championships	Paris, France	7th	4.45 m
2004	World Indoor Championships	Budapest, Hungary	7th	4.40 m
2004	Olympic Games	Athens, Greece	3rd	4.70 m
2004	World Athletics Final	Monte Carlo, Monaco	3rd	4.60 m
2005	European Indoor Championships	Madrid, Spain	2nd	4.75 m
2005	World Championships	Helsinki, Finland	6th	4.35 m
2005	World Athletics Final	Monte Carlo, Monaco	7th	4.35 m
2006	World Indoor Championships	Moscow, Russia	2nd	4.75 m
2007	European Indoor Championships	Birmingham, United Kingdom	3rd	4.66 m
2007	World Championships	Osaka, Japan	8th	4.60 m
2008	World Indoor Championships	Valencia, Spain	6th	4.55 m
2008	Olympic Games	Beijing, China	10th	4.45 m
2009	World Championships	Berlin, Germany	1st	4.75 m
2010	World Indoor Championships	Doha, Qatar	3rd	4.70 m
2011	European Indoor Championship	Paris, France	1st	4.85 m NR
2011	World Championships	Daegu, South Korea	10th	4.55 m
2012	Olympic Games	London, United Kingdom	—	NM
2013	European Indoor Championship	Gothenburg, Sweden	2nd	4.67 m
2013	World Championships	Moscow, Russia	–	NM
2014	World Indoor Championships	Sopot, Poland	5th	4.65 m

- NM = No Mark
- At the 2012 London Olympic Games, Rogowska reached the final by clearing 4.55m, but in the final she failed to register a mark, fouling three times at her opening height of 4.45 m.
