= Natalya Kushch-Mazuryk =

Ukrainian pole vaulter

Personal information
- Born: March 5, 1983 (age 42)
- Height: 1.72 m (5 ft 7 1/2 in)
- Weight: 63 kg (139 lb)

Sport
- Country: Ukraine
- Sport: Athletics
- Event: Pole vault
- Updated on 15 August 2012

Natalya Kushch-Mazuryk (Ukrainian: Наталя Кущ-Мазурик; née Kushch, Ukrainian: Кущ; born 5 March 1983 in Donetsk, Ukraine) is a Ukrainian pole vaulter. She competed at the 2012 Summer Olympics.

== Competition record ==
Year	Competition	Venue	Position	Notes
Representing Ukraine
1999	World Youth Championships	Bydgoszcz, Poland	5th	3.75 m
2000	World Junior Championships	Santiago, Chile	—	NH
2001	European Junior Championships	Grosseto, Italy	2nd	4.15 m
2002	World Junior Championships	Kingston, Jamaica	6th	4.00 m
2003	World Indoor Championships	Birmingham, United Kingdom	13th (q)	4.10 m
2003	European U23 Championships	Bydgoszcz, Poland	4th	4.30 m
2003	World Championships	Paris, France	14th (q)	4.25 m
2005	European U23 Championships	Erfurt, Germany	1st	4.30 m
2005	World Championships	Helsinki, Finland	24th (q)	4.15 m
2006	World Indoor Championships	Moscow, Russia	13th (q)	4.35 m
2008	World Indoor Championships	Valencia, Spain	–	NM
2008	Olympic Games	Beijing, China	27th (q)	4.15 m
2012	European Championships	Helsinki, Finland	15th (q)	4.35 m
2012	Olympic Games	London, United Kingdom	26th (q)	4.25 m
