= Tatyana Polnova =

Russian pole vaulter (born 1979)

Personal information
- Native name: Татьяна Полнова
- Other names: Tuna Köstem (Turkish)
- Born: Tatyana Fyodorovna Zaykova; 20 April 1979 (age 47) Slavyansk-on-Kuban, Russian SFSR, Soviet Union
- Years active: 1997–2013
- Height: 172 cm (5 ft 8 in)
- Weight: 64 kg (141 lb)

Sport
- Country: Russia; Turkey (1998–2002)
- Sport: Athletics
- Event: Pole vault
- Club: Fenerbahçe Athletics
- Retired: 2013

Achievements and titles
- Personal bests: Outdoor: 4.78 (2004); Indoor: 4.71 (2004)
Medal record
Women's pole vault
Representing Russia
Event	1st	2nd	3rd
European Championship	–	–	1
Universiade	1	–	–
World Athletics Final	1	1	1
Total	2	1	2
European Championships
Bronze medal – third place	2006 Gothenburg	Pole vault
Universiade
Gold medal – first place	2003 Daegu	Pole vault

Tatyana Fyodorovna Polnova née Zaykova (Russian: Татьяна Фёдоровна Полнова (Зайкова), born 20 April 1979) is a Soviet-born Russian pole vaulter. She represented Turkey between 1998 and 2002, during which time she competed under the Turkish name Tuna Köstem and was also known as Tatiana Tuna Köstem.

== Career ==
Her first pole vault coach was Sergei Gripich, a nationally recognized youth coach who also trained Yevgeny Lukyanenko, Aleksandr Gripich, and Anton Ivakin.

She achieved a second-place finish at the 1998 Russian Indoor Athletics Championships with 4.00 metres.

In 1998, Polnova relocated to Istanbul to join the women's team of Fenerbahçe Athletics. She gained Turkish citizenship at that time and began representing Turkey in competition under the Turkish name Tuna Köstem. In May 1998, shortly after her arrival, she set the Turkish record for women's pole vault in both the junior and senior categories.

Polnova returned to Russia after 2002 and began representing her native country in competition. As a member of the Russian delegation at the 2003 Summer Universiade in Daegu, she achieved gold at 4.70 m. She then claimed first place at the 2003 IAAF World Athletics Final in Monaco.

Polnova's personal best is 4.78 metres, achieved in September 2004 in Monaco.

She sustained a career ending injury at the Russian championships in 2013.

== International competitions ==
Year	Competition	Venue	Position	Result	Notes
Representing Russia
1997	European Junior Championships	Ljubljana, Slovenia	8th	3.75 m	
Representing Turkey
1998	World Junior Championships	Annecy, France	10th	3.90 m	as T.Tuna Kostem
1998	European Championships	Budapest, Hungary	24th (q)	3.80 m	
Representing Russia
2003	Universiade	Daegu, South Korea	1st	4.70 m	
2003	World Athletics Final	Monte Carlo, Monaco	1st	4.68 m	
2004	World Athletics Final	Monte Carlo, Monaco	2nd	4.78 m	
2005	European Indoor Championships	Madrid, Spain	5th	4.60 m	
2005	World Championships	Helsinki, Finland	4th	4.50 m	
2005	World Athletics Final	Monte Carlo, Monaco	3rd	4.50 m	
2006	European Championships	Gothenburg, Sweden	3rd	4.65 m	
2007	World Championships	Osaka, Japan	9th	4.60 m	
2009	World Championships	Berlin, Germany	7th	4.40 m	

== See also ==
- List of European Athletics Championships medalists (women)
