= 2003 IAAF World Indoor Championships – Women's pole vault =

The women's pole vault event at the 2003 IAAF World Indoor Championships was held on 15–16 March 2003.

The winning margin was 20 cm which as of July 2024 remains the only time the women's pole vault was won by more than 10 cm at these championships.

== Medalists ==
Gold	Silver	Bronze
Svetlana Feofanova; Russia	Yelena Isinbayeva; Russia	Monika Pyrek; Poland

== Results ==
=== Qualification ===
Qualification: Qualification Performance 4.35 (Q) or at least 8 best performers advanced to the final.

Rank	Group	Athlete	Nationality	4.10	4.25	4.30	4.35	Result	Notes
1	B	Yelena Isinbayeva	Russia	o	o	–	o	4.35	Q
1	B	Monika Pyrek	Poland	–	o	–	o	4.35	Q
1	B	Svetlana Feofanova	Russia	–	–	–	o	4.35	Q
4	A	Vanessa Boslak	France	o	xo	–	o	4.35	Q
4	A	Tanya Stefanova	Bulgaria	–	o	xo	o	4.35	Q
4	B	Annika Becker	Germany	xo	o	–	o	4.35	Q
7	B	Anna Rogowska	Poland	o	o	–	xo	4.35	Q
8	B	Kellie Suttle	United States	o	o	o	xxo	4.35	Q
9	B	Thórey Edda Elisdóttir	Iceland	xo	o	xo	xxx	4.35	
10	A	Kirsten Belin	Sweden	o	o	xxx		4.25	
11	A	Krisztina Molnár	Hungary	o	xxo	xxx		4.25	
12	A	Naroa Agirre	Spain	xo	xxx			4.10	
13	A	Natalya Kushch	Ukraine	xxo	xxx			4.10	
	A	Monique de Wilt	Netherlands	xxx				NM	
	A	Gao Shuying	China	xxx				NM	
	A	Marie Poissonnier	France	xxx				NM	
	B	Stacy Dragila	United States	–	–	xxx		NM	

=== Final ===
Rank	Athlete	Nationality	4.20	4.35	4.45	4.55	4.60	4.65	4.70	4.75	4.80	Result	Notes
1st place, gold medalist(s)	Svetlana Feofanova	Russia	–	o	o	xo	o	o	o	o	xo	4.80	WR
2nd place, silver medalist(s)	Yelena Isinbayeva	Russia	xo	o	o	o	o	x–	–	xx		4.60	
3rd place, bronze medalist(s)	Monika Pyrek	Poland	o	o	o	xxx						4.45	
4	Kellie Suttle	United States	o	xxo	o	xxx						4.45	SB
5	Annika Becker	Germany	o	xo	xo	xxx						4.45	
6	Tanya Stefanova	Bulgaria	o	xo	xxx							4.35	
6	Anna Rogowska	Poland	o	xo	xxx							4.35	
	Vanessa Boslak	France	xxx									NM	
