= 2008 IAAF World Indoor Championships – Women's pole vault =

Sporting event

== Medalists ==
Gold
Yelena Isinbaeva	Russia
Silver
Jennifer Stuczynski	United States
Bronze
Fabiana Murer	Brazil
Monika Pyrek	Poland

== Qualification ==
Qualification rule: qualification standard 4.55m or at least best 8 qualified

Pos	Athlete	Country	Mark	Q	Attempts						
Pos	Athlete	Country	Mark	Q	3.95	4.15	4.25	4.35	4.45	4.50	4.55
1	Yelena Isinbaeva	Russia	4.55	Q	-	-	-	-	-	-	O
2	Monika Pyrek	Poland	4.50	q	-	-	-	O	-	O	-
2	Anna Battke	Germany	4.50	q	-	-	O	-	O	O	-
4	Jennifer Stuczynski	United States	4.50	q	-	-	-	-	-	XO	-
4	Fabiana Murer	Brazil	4.50	q	-	-	-	O	O	XO	-
6	Anna Rogowska	Poland	4.50	q	-	-	-	XO	-	XXO	-
7	Svetlana Feofanova	Russia	4.45	q	-	-	-	-	O	-	-
8	Naroa Agirre	Spain	4.45 SB	q	O	O	XO	O	XXO	XXX	
8	Pavla Rybová	Czech Republic	4.45	q	-	O	-	XO	XXO	XXX	
10	Julia Hütter	Germany	4.35		-	-	XO	O	XXX		
11	Jillian Schwartz	United States	4.35		-	-	-	XO	XXX		
12	Elisabete Tavares Ansel	Portugal	4.25		O	O	O	XXX			
13	Joana Costa	Brazil	4.15 PB		O	XO	XXX				
13	Nikoléta Kiriakopoúlou	Greece	4.15		-	XO	XXX				
	Natalya Kushch	Ukraine	NM		-	-	XXX				
	Roslinda Samsu	Malaysia	DNS								

== Final ==
Pos	Athlete	Country	Mark	Attempts										
Pos	Athlete	Country	Mark	4.30	4.40	4.45	4.50	4.55	4.60	4.65	4.70	4.75	4.80	4.85
Gold medal	Yelena Isinbaeva	Russia	4.75	-	-	-	-	-	-	O	-	O	-	XXX
Silver medal	Jennifer Stuczynski	United States	4.75 PB	-	-	-	O	-	O	-	O	XO	-	XXX
Bronze medal	Fabiana Murer	Brazil	4.70 AR	-	O	-	O	-	O	-	O	XXX		
Bronze medal	Monika Pyrek	Poland	4.70 SB	-	O	-	-	-	O	-	O	XXX		
5	Svetlana Feofanova	Russia	4.60	-	O	-	O	-	O	-	X-	XX		
6	Anna Rogowska	Poland	4.55	-	O	-	-	XO	-	X-	XX			
7	Pavla Rybová	Czech Republic	4.50	XXO	-	XX-	O	XXX						
8	Anna Battke	Germany	4.45	O	-	O	-	XXX						
9	Naroa Agirre	Spain	4.40	XXO	O	-	XXX							
