= 2005 World Championships in Athletics – Women's pole vault =

Video on YouTube Official video

These are the official results of the Women's Pole Vault event at the 2005 World Championships in Helsinki, Finland, held on August 7 and August 12, 2005.

The winning margin was 41 cm. As of 2024, this is the only time the women's pole vault has been won by more than 20 cm at these championships.

== Medalists ==
Gold	Yelena Isinbayeva; Russia (RUS)
Silver	Monika Pyrek; Poland (POL)
Bronze	Pavla Hamáčková; Czech Republic (CZE)

== Schedule ==
- All times are Eastern European Time (UTC+2)

Qualification Round
Group A	Group B
07. 08. 2005 – 13:30h	07. 08. 2005 – 15:00h
Final Round
12. 08. 2005 – 18:10h

== Records ==
World Record	Yelena Isinbayeva (RUS)	5.00	London, England	22 July 2005
Championship Record	Stacy Dragila (USA)	4.75	Edmonton, Canada	6 August 2001
Championship Record	Svetlana Feofanova (RUS)	4.75	Edmonton, Canada	6 August 2001
Championship Record	Svetlana Feofanova (RUS)	4.75	Paris, France	25 August 2003

== Results ==
=== Qualification ===
Group A

1. Anna Rogowska, Poland 4.45m Q
2. Jillian Schwartz, United States 4.45m Q
2. Tatyana Polnova, Russia 4.45m Q
4. Caroline Hingst, Germany 4.45m Q
5. Vanessa Boslak, France 4.40m q
6. Tracy O'Hara, United States 4.40m q
6. Naroa Agirre, Spain 4.40m q (SB)
8. Janine Whitlock, Great Britain 4.40m
9. Thórey Edda Elisdóttir, Iceland 4.15m
9. Takayo Kondo, Japan 4.15m
9. Kirsten Belin, Sweden 4.15m
12. Melina Hamilton, New Zealand 4.15m
13. Natalya Kushch, Ukraine 4.15m
14. Kelsey Hendry, Canada 4.00m
14. Zhao Yingying, China 4.00m

Group B

1. Monika Pyrek, Poland 4.45m Q
1. Yelena Isinbayeva, Russia 4.45m Q
3. Gao Shuying, China 4.45m Q (SB)
4. Dana Ellis, Canada 4.40m q
4. Pavla Hamáčková, Czech Republic 4.40m q
6. Tatiana Grigorieva, Australia 4.45m q
7. Fabiana Murer, Brazil 4.40m (NR)
8. Stacy Dragila, United States 4.40m
9. Anzhela Balakhonova, Ukraine 4.15m
9. Krisztina Molnár, Hungary 4.15m
9. Afroditi Skafida, Greece 4.15 m
12. Elisabete Tavares, Portugal 4.00m
13. Teja Melink, Slovenia 4.00m

- Anna Fitidou, Cyprus NM
- Nadine Rohr, Switzerland NM

=== Final ===
Rank	Name	4.00	4.20	4.35	4.50	4.60	4.70	4.75	5.01	Result	Notes
Gold medal	Yelena Isinbayeva (RUS)	-	-	-	o	o	o	-	xo	5.01	WR
Silver medal	Monika Pyrek (POL)	-	o	o	xo	o	xx-	x		4.60	
Bronze medal	Pavla Hamáčková (CZE)	-	xo	o	o	xxx				4.50	
4	Tatyana Polnova (RUS)	-	o	o	xxo	xxx				4.50	SB
5	Gao Shuying (CHN)	xo	o	xo	xxo	xxx				4.50	SB
6	Dana Ellis (CAN)	-	o	o	xxx					4.35	
6	Anna Rogowska (POL)	-	-	o	xxx					4.35	
8	Vanessa Boslak (FRA)	-	xo	xo	xxx					4.35	
9	Naroa Agirre (ESP)	o	o	xxo	xxx					4.35	
10	Caroline Hingst (GER)	xo	o	xxo	xxx					4.35	
11	Jillian Schwartz (USA)	-	xo	xxx						4.20	
12	Tatiana Grigorieva (AUS)	o	xxx							4.00	
—	Tracy O'Hara (USA)	-	xxx							NM	
