= 2013 World Championships in Athletics – Women's pole vault =

Women's pole vault at the 2013 World Championships
- Venue: Luzhniki Stadium
- Dates: 11 August (qualification); 13 August (final)
- Competitors: 22 from 13 nations
- Winning height: 4.89 m (16 ft 1/2 in)

Medalists
gold medal	Yelena Isinbayeva; Russia
silver medal	Jenn Suhr; United States
bronze medal	Yarisley Silva; Cuba

Official Video

The women's pole vault at the 2013 World Championships in Athletics was held at the Luzhniki Stadium on 11–13 August.

Missing on her first attempt, home stadium favorite and world record holder Yelena Isinbayeva found herself in third place behind Silke Spiegelburg and Jennifer Suhr, both of whom were perfect to 4.75. Along with Yarisley Silva, who struggled with misses at several heights, these four athletes went to 4.82, where Suhr and Isinbaeva made it on their second attempts, giving Suhr the lead, Silva on her third and Spiegelburg bowed out. At 4.89, Isinbaeva moved into first place with a first attempt clearance. Suhr and then Silva failed to negotiate the same height. Isinbayeva then took three attempts at her own world record, but failed.

== Records ==
Prior to the competition, the established records were as follows.

World record	Elena Isinbaeva (RUS)	5.06	Zürich, Switzerland	28 August 2009
Championship record	Elena Isinbaeva (RUS)	5.01	Helsinki, Finland	12 August 2005
World leading	Jennifer Suhr (USA)	5.02iA	Albuquerque, NM, United States	2 March 2013
African record	Elmarie Gerryts (RSA)	4.42	Wesel, Germany	12 June 2000
Asian record	Shuying Gao (CHN)	4.64	New York City, United States	2 June 2007
North, Central American and Caribbean record	Jennifer Suhr (USA)	4.92	Eugene, OR, United States	6 July 2008
South American record	Fabiana Murer (BRA)	4.85	San Fernando, Cádiz, Spain	4 June 2010
European record	Elena Isinbaeva (RUS)	5.06	Zürich, Switzerland	28 August 2009
Oceanian record	Kym Howe (AUS)	4.65	Saulheim, Germany	30 June 2007

== Qualification standards ==
A result	B result
4.60	4.50

== Schedule ==
Date	Time	Round
11 August 2013	19:10	Qualification
13 August 2013	19:35	Final

All times are local times (UTC+4)

== Results ==
KEY:	Q	Qualified	q	12 best performers	NR	National record	PB	Personal best	SB	Seasonal best

=== Qualification ===
Qualification: 4.60 m (Q) and at least 12 best (q) advanced to the final.

Rank	Group	Name	Nationality	4.15	4.30	4.45	4.55	4.60	Mark	Notes
1	A	Yelena Isinbayeva	Russia	-	-	-	o		4.55	q
1	A	Silke Spiegelburg	Germany	-	-	o	o		4.55	q
1	B	Angelina Zhuk-Krasnova	Russia	-	o	o	o		4.55	q
1	B	Jiřina Ptáčníková	Czech Republic	-	o	o	o		4.55	q
5	A	Li Ling	China	o	xo	o	o		4.55	q, PB
6	B	Anastasia Savchenko	Russia	-	o	o	xo		4.55	q
6	B	Jenn Suhr	United States	-	-	-	xo		4.55	q
8	B	Lisa Ryzih	Germany	-	xo	xxo	xo		4.55	q
9	B	Fabiana Murer	Brazil	-	-	-	xxo		4.55	q
9	A	Marion Lotout	France	o	o	o	xxo		4.55	q
9	A	Yarisley Silva	Cuba	-	-	o	xxo		4.55	q
9	A	Kristina Gadschiew	Germany	-	o	o	xxo		4.55	q
13	A	Nikoleta Kyriakopoulou	Greece	-	o	o	xxx		4.45	
13	A	Becky Holliday	United States	-	o	o	xxx		4.45	
15	B	Nicole Büchler	Switzerland	-	o	xo	xxx		4.45	
16	B	Angelica Bengtsson	Sweden	o	xo	xo	xxx		4.45	
17	B	Carolin Hingst	Germany	o	o	xxo	-	xxx	4.45	
18	B	Tori Pena	Ireland	-	o	xxx			4.30	
19	A	Karla Rosa da Silva	Brazil	o	xo	xxx			4.30	
	A	Kylie Hutson	United States	-	xxx				NM	
	A	Anna Rogowska	Poland	-	-	xxx			NM	
	B	Stélla-Iró Ledáki	Greece	xxx					NM	

=== Final ===
The final was started at 19:35.

Rank	Name	Nationality	4.30	4.45	4.55	4.65	4.75	4.82	4.89	5.07	Mark	Notes
1st place, gold medalist(s)	Yelena Isinbayeva	Russia	–	–	–	xo	o	xo	o	xxx	4.89	SB
2nd place, silver medalist(s)	Jenn Suhr	United States	–	–	o	–	o	xo	xxx		4.82	
3rd place, bronze medalist(s)	Yarisley Silva	Cuba	–	–	o	xxo	xo	xxo	xxx		4.82	
4	Silke Spiegelburg	Germany	–	o	o	o	o	xxx			4.75	SB
5	Fabiana Murer	Brazil	–	–	o	o	xxx				4.65	
5	Anastasia Savchenko	Russia	o	o	o	o	xxx				4.65	
7	Angelina Zhuk-Krasnova	Russia	o	o	o	xo	xxx				4.65	
8	Lisa Ryzih	Germany	–	o	xo	xxx					4.55	SB
8	Jiřina Ptáčníková	Czech Republic	o	o	xo	xxx					4.55	
10	Kristina Gadschiew	Germany	o	o	xxx						4.45	
11	Li Ling	China	xo	o	xxx						4.45	
12	Marion Lotout	France	o	xo	xxx						4.45	
