= Teja Melink =

Slovenian pole vaulter

Teja Melink (born 23 March 1980) is a Slovenian pole vaulter.

She finished seventh at the 2005 Summer Universiade. She also competed at the 1998 European Championships, the 2002 European Indoor Championships, the 2004 Olympic Games, the 2005 European Indoor Championships and the 2005 World Championships without reaching the final round.

Her personal best jump is 4.30 metres, achieved in July 2004 in Trieste. This was the Slovenian record at the time.

== Competition record ==
Year	Competition	Venue	Position	Notes
Representing Slovenia
1998	World Junior Championships	Annecy, France	22nd (q)	3.50 m
1998	European Championships	Budapest, Hungary	26th (q)	3.40 m
2001	European U23 Championships	Amsterdam, Netherlands	3rd (q)	4.05 m
2002	European Indoor Championships	Vienna, Austria	24th (q)	3.80 m
2004	Olympic Games	Athens, Greece	24th (q)	4.15 m
2005	European Indoor Championships	Madrid, Spain	19th (q)	4.15 m
2005	Mediterranean Games	Almería, Spain	4th	4.15 m
2005	World Championships	Helsinki, Finland	26th (q)	4.00 m
2005	Universiade	İzmir, Turkey	7th	4.00 m
