= 2000 World Junior Championships in Athletics – Women's pole vault =

The women's pole vault event at the 2000 World Junior Championships in Athletics was held in Santiago, Chile, at Estadio Nacional Julio Martínez Prádanos on 18 October.

== Medalists ==
Gold	Yelena Isinbaeva; Russia
Silver	Annika Becker; Germany
Bronze	Vanessa Boslak; France
Bronze	Fanni Juhász; Hungary

== Results ==
=== Final ===
18 October

Rank	Name	Nationality	Result	Notes
1st place, gold medalist(s)	Yelena Isinbaeva	Russia	4.20	
2nd place, silver medalist(s)	Annika Becker	Germany	4.10	
3rd place, bronze medalist(s)	Vanessa Boslak	France	4.10	
3rd place, bronze medalist(s)	Fanni Juhász	Hungary	4.10	
5	Martina Strutz	Germany	4.00	
6	Bridgid Isworth	Australia	3.70	
6	Lucie Palasová	Czech Republic	3.70	
6	Michaela Boulová	Czech Republic	3.70	
9	Anna Wielgus	Poland	3.70	
10	Fabiana Murer	Brazil	3.70	
11	Solenne Allain	France	3.50	
11	Maria Rendin	Sweden	3.50	
13	Liesbeth Van Roie	Belgium	3.50	
14	María Paz Ausin	Chile	3.50	
14	Ellie Spain	United Kingdom	3.50	
	Annu Mäkelä	Finland	NH	
	Natalya Kushch	Ukraine	NH	
	Kathleen Donoghue	United States	NH	
	Laura Rosenberger	United States	NH	

== Participation ==
According to an unofficial count, 19 athletes from 15 countries participated in the event.

- Australia (1)
- Belgium (1)
- Brazil (1)
- Chile (1)
- Czech Republic (2)
- Finland (1)
- France (2)
- Germany (2)
- Hungary (1)
- Poland (1)
- Russia (1)
- Sweden (1)
- Ukraine (1)
- United Kingdom (1)
- United States (2)
