= Joana Costa =

Brazilian pole vaulter (born 1981)

Personal information
- Born: 15 May 1981 (age 45) São Paulo, Brazil

Sport
- Sport: Track and field
- Event: Pole vault

Joana Ribeiro Costa (born 15 May 1981) is a Brazilian athlete who specializes in the pole vault. Her personal best jump is 4.50 metres from 2016. She represented her country at the 2007 World Championships failing to progress past the qualifying round. She also represented Brazil at the 2016 Summer Olympics.

== Competition record ==
Year	Competition	Venue	Position	Event	Notes
Representing Brazil
1998	South American Junior Championships	Córdoba, Argentina	3rd	Pole vault	3.25 m
1998	World Youth Games	Moscow, Russia	7th	4 × 100 m relay	49.33 s
1998	World Youth Games	Moscow, Russia	10th	Pole vault	3.20 m
1999	South American Junior Championships	Concepción, Chile	2nd	Pole vault	3.70 m
2000	Ibero-American Championships	Rio de Janeiro, Brazil	8th	Pole vault	3.50 m
2004	Ibero-American Championships	Huelva, Spain	6th	Pole vault	4.10 m
2005	South American Championships	Cali, Colombia	1st	Pole vault	4.20 m
2005	Universiade	İzmir, Turkey	9th	Pole vault	4.00 m
2006	Ibero-American Championships	Ponce, Puerto Rico	2nd	Pole vault	4.10 m
2006	South American Championships	Tunja, Colombia	4th	Pole vault	3.90 m
2007	South American Championships	São Paulo, Brazil	3rd	Pole vault	4.20 m
2007	Pan American Games	Rio de Janeiro, Brazil	5th	Pole vault	4.20 m
2007	Universiade	Bangkok, Thailand	9th	Pole vault	4.15 m
2007	World Championships	Osaka, Japan	32nd (q)	Pole vault	4.05 m
2008	World Indoor Championships	Valencia, Spain	13th (q)	Pole vault	4.15 m
2008	Ibero-American Championships	Iquique, Chile	1st	Pole vault	4.20 m
2013	South American Championships	Cartagena, Colombia	–	Pole vault	NM
2016	Ibero-American Championships	Rio de Janeiro, Brazil	3rd	Pole vault	4.10 m
2016	Olympic Games	Rio de Janeiro, Brazil	29th (q)	Pole vault	4.15 m
2017	South American Championships	Asunción, Paraguay	2nd	Pole vault	4.20 m
