= 2010 IAAF World Indoor Championships – Women's pole vault =

The women's pole vault at the 2010 IAAF World Indoor Championships was held at the ASPIRE Dome on 12 and 14 March.

== Medalists ==
Gold	Silver	Bronze
Fabiana Murer; Brazil	Svetlana Feofanova; Russia	Anna Rogowska; Poland

== Records ==
Standing records prior to the 2010 IAAF World Indoor Championships
World record	Yelena Isinbayeva (RUS)	5.00	Donetsk, Ukraine	15 February 2009
Championship record	Yelena Isinbayeva (RUS)	4.86	Budapest, Hungary	6 March 2004
World Leading	Yelena Isinbayeva (RUS)	4.85	Moscow, Russia	7 February 2010
World Leading	Yelena Isinbayeva (RUS)	4.85	Donetsk, Ukraine	6 March 2010
African record	Elmarie Gerryts (RSA)	4.41	Birmingham, Great Britain	20 February 2000
Asian record	Zhang Yingning (CHN)	4.46	Shanghai, China	15 March 2007
European record	Yelena Isinbayeva (RUS)	5.00	Donetsk, Ukraine	15 February 2009
North and Central American and Caribbean record	Jennifer Stuczynski (USA)	4.83	Boston, United States	1 March 2009
Oceanian Record	Kym Howe (AUS)	4.72	Donetsk, Ukraine	10 February 2007
South American record	Fabiana Murer (BRA)	4.82	Birmingham, Great Britain	20 February 2010

== Qualification standards ==
Indoor
4.40 m

== Schedule ==
Date	Time	Round			
March 12, 2010	16:20	Qualification	March 14, 2010	16:20	Final

== Results ==
=== Qualification ===
Qualification: Qualifying Performance 4.60 (Q) or at least 8 best performers (q) advance to the final.

Rank	Athlete	Nationality	4.20	4.35	4.45	4.55	Result	Notes
1	Yelena Isinbayeva	Russia	-	-	-	xxo	4.55	q
2	Fabiana Murer	Brazil	-	-	o		4.45	q
2	Nikoléta Kiriakopoúlou	Greece	o	o	o		4.45	q
2	Svetlana Feofanova	Russia	-	-	o		4.45	q
5	Kelsie Hendry	Canada	-	o	xo		4.45	q
5	Anna Rogowska	Poland	-	-	xo		4.45	q
7	Jiřina Ptáčníková	Czech Republic	o	o	xxo	-	4.45	q
8	Kristina Gadschiew	Germany	o	o	xxx		4.35	q
9	Kate Dennison	Great Britain	xo	o	xxx		4.35	
9	Elena Scarpellini	Italy	xo	o	xxx		4.35	
11	Afrodíti Skafída	Greece	o	xxo	xxx		4.35	
11	Chelsea Johnson	United States	-	xxo	xxx		4.35	
13	Marianna Zachariadi	Cyprus	xxo	xxo	xxx		4.35	SB
14	Li Caixia	China	o	xxx			4.20	SB
15	Pavla Rybová	Czech Republic	xo	xxx			4.20	
16	Li Ling	China	xxo	xxx			4.20	
	Carolin Hingst	Germany	-	-	xxx		NM	
	Lacy Janson	United States	-	xxx			NM	

=== Final ===
Rank	Athlete	Nationality	4.30	4.40	4.50	4.60	4.65	4.70	4.75	4.80	4.85	Result	Notes
1st place, gold medalist(s)	Fabiana Murer	Brazil	-	-	o	o	-	o	xxo	o	xxx	4.80	
2nd place, silver medalist(s)	Svetlana Feofanova	Russia	-	o	-	o	-	o	-	xo	xxx	4.80	SB
3rd place, bronze medalist(s)	Anna Rogowska	Poland	-	o	-	xxo	-	xo	xxx			4.70	
4	Yelena Isinbayeva	Russia	-	-	-	o	-	-	xxx			4.60	
5	Jiřina Ptáčníková	Czech Republic	o	o	o	xo	xxx					4.60	PB
6	Kelsie Hendry	Canada	-	xxo	xo	xxx						4.50	
7	Kristina Gadschiew	Germany	o	o	xxx							4.40	
	Nikoléta Kiriakopoúlou	Greece	xxx									NM	
