= 2005 European Athletics Indoor Championships – Women's pole vault =

The Women's pole vault event at the 2005 European Athletics Indoor Championships was held on March 4–6.

== Medalists ==
Gold	Silver	Bronze
Yelena Isinbayeva; Russia	Anna Rogowska; Poland	Monika Pyrek; Poland

== Results ==
Qualification: Qualification performance 4.50 (Q) or at least 8 best performers advanced to the final.

Rank	Group	Athlete	Nationality	3.80	4.00	4.15	4.30	4.40	4.50	Result	Notes
1	A	Tatyana Polnova	Russia	–	–	o	o	o	o	4.50	Q
1	A	Anna Rogowska	Poland	–	–	o	–	o	o	4.50	Q
1	B	Monika Pyrek	Poland	–	–	–	o	o	o	4.50	Q
4	B	Carolin Hingst	Germany	–	–	o	o	o	xo	4.50	Q
4	B	Yelena Isinbayeva	Russia	–	–	–	–	–	xo	4.50	Q
6	A	Natalya Belinskaya	Russia	–	o	o	o	o	xxx	4.40	q
7	B	Pavla Hamáčková	Czech Republic	–	–	o	xo	o	xxx	4.40	q, SB
8	A	Janine Whitlock	Great Britain	–	o	xo	xo	o	xxx	4.40	q, SB
9	B	Tania Stefanova	Bulgaria	–	–	–	xxo	xo	xxx	4.40	q
10	A	Naroa Agirre	Spain	–	o	o	o	xxx		4.30	
10	B	Kirsten Belin	Sweden	o	o	o	o	xxx		4.30	SB
12	A	Martina Strutz	Germany	–	o	xo	o	xxx		4.30	
13	A	Vanessa Boslak	France	–	–	xo	xo	xxx		4.30	
13	B	Krisztina Molnár	Hungary	–	o	xo	xo	xxx		4.30	
15	B	Elisabete Tavares	Portugal	o	o	xo	xxo	xxx		4.30	NR
16	B	Mar Sánchez	Spain	–	o	o	xxx			4.15	
16	B	Dana Cervantes	Spain	–	o	o	xx–	x		4.15	
18	A	Sandra Tavares	Portugal	xo	xo	o	xxx			4.15	
19	A	Teja Melink	Slovenia	o	o	xo	xxx			4.15	PB
19	A	Hanna-Mia Persson	Sweden	–	o	xo	xxx			4.15	
21	A	Linda Persson	Sweden	o	xo	xo	xxx			4.15	
22	A	Anna Fitidou	Cyprus	xo	xo	xxo	xxx			4.15	
23	B	Nina Vezjak	Slovenia	o	o	xxx				4.00	
24	B	Ivona Jerković	Croatia	o	xo	xxx				4.00	=NR
25	A	Anita Tørring	Denmark	xo	xxx					3.80	
25	B	Aurore Pignot	France	xo	xxx					3.80	

=== Final ===
Rank	Athlete	Nationality	4.20	4.35	4.45	4.55	4.60	4.65	4.70	4.75	4.80	4.90	Result	Notes
1st place, gold medalist(s)	Yelena Isinbayeva	Russia	–	–	–	–	x–	–	o	–	o	o	4.90	WR, CR
2nd place, silver medalist(s)	Anna Rogowska	Poland	o	–	o	o	–	o	o	xo	xxx		4.75	=NR
3rd place, bronze medalist(s)	Monika Pyrek	Poland	–	o	–	o	–	–	o	xx–	x		4.70	PB
4	Carolin Hingst	Germany	o	o	o	o	–	xo	xxx				4.65	PB
5	Tatyana Polnova	Russia	o	o	o	xo	xo	xxx					4.60	=SB
6	Pavla Hamáčková	Czech Republic	xo	o	o	xxo	xxx						4.55	SB
7	Natalya Belinskaya	Russia	xo	xxo	o	xxx							4.45	
8	Tania Stefanova	Bulgaria	o	o	xxx								4.35	
9	Janine Whitlock	Great Britain	o	xxx									4.20	
