= Yelena Isinbayeva =

Russian Olympic pole-vaulter

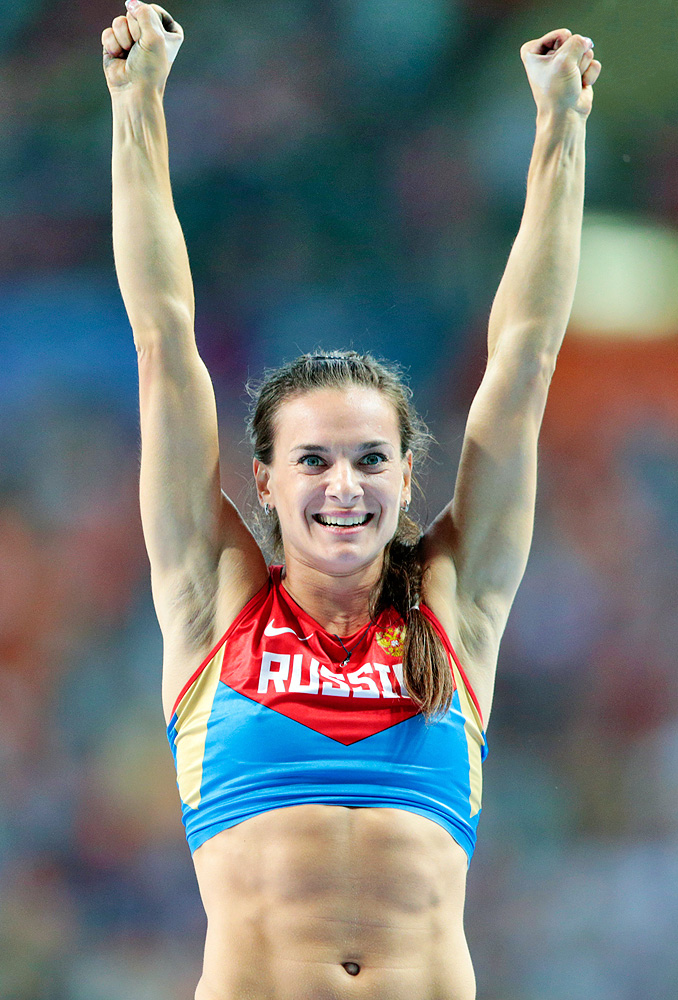
- Isinbayeva in 2013

Personal information
- Full name: Yelena Gadzhievna Isinbayeva
- Nationality: Russian
- Born: 3 June 1982 (age 44) Volgograd, Russian SFSR, Soviet Union
- Height: 1.74 m (5 ft 8 1/2 in)
- Weight: 64 kg (141 lb)

Sport
- Country: Russia
- Sport: Women's athletics
- Event: Pole vault
- Club: CSKA Moscow
- Coached by: Yevgeny Trofimov; Vitaly Petrov
- Retired: 20 August 2016

Achievements and titles
- Olympic finals: 2004, 2008
- World finals: Outdoor: 2003, 2005, 2007; Indoor: 2003, 2004, 2006, 2008
- Regional finals: Outdoor: 2002, 2006; Indoor: 2005
- Highest world ranking: 1st (2005–2009)
- Personal bests: Outdoor: 5.06 WR (2009) indoor: 5.01 ER (2012)
Medal record
Event	1st	2nd	3rd
Olympic Games	2	0	1
World Championships	3	0	1
World Indoor Championships	4	1	0
World Cup	1	0	0
European Championships	1	1	0
European Indoor Championships	1	0	0
European U23 Championships	1	0	0
World Junior Championships	1	0	0
European Junior Championships	1	0	0
World Youth Championships	1	0	0
Olympic Games
Gold medal – first place	2004 Athens	Pole vault
Gold medal – first place	2008 Beijing	Pole vault
Bronze medal – third place	2012 London	Pole vault
World Championships
Gold medal – first place	2005 Helsinki	Pole vault
Gold medal – first place	2007 Osaka	Pole vault
Gold medal – first place	2013 Moscow	Pole vault
Bronze medal – third place	2003 Paris	Pole vault
World Indoor Championships
Gold medal – first place	2004 Budapest	Pole vault
Gold medal – first place	2006 Moscow	Pole vault
Gold medal – first place	2008 Valencia	Pole vault
Gold medal – first place	2012 Istanbul	Pole vault
Silver medal – second place	2003 Birmingham	Pole vault
World Cup
Gold medal – first place	2006 Athens	Pole vault
European Championships
Gold medal – first place	2006 Gothenburg	Pole vault
Silver medal – second place	2002 Munich	Pole vault
European Indoor Championships
Gold medal – first place	2005 Madrid	Pole vault
European U23 Championships
Gold medal – first place	2003 Bydgoszcz	Pole vault
World Junior Championships
Gold medal – first place	2000 Santiago	Pole vault
European Junior Championships
Gold medal – first place	2001 Grosseto	Pole vault
World Youth Championships
Gold medal – first place	1999 Bydgoszcz	Pole vault
World Youth Games
Gold medal – first place	1998 Moscow	Pole vault
- Updated on 6 August 2012

Yelena Gadzhievna Isinbayeva (Russian: Елена Гаджиевна Исинбаева, IPA: [jɪˈlʲɛnə gɐˈdʐɨjɪvnə ɪsʲɪnˈbajɪvə]; also spelled as Elena Isinbaeva; born 3 June 1982) is a Russian former pole vaulter. She is twice an Olympic gold medalist (2004 and 2008), three-times a World Champion (2005, 2007 and 2013), the current world record holder in the event, and is widely considered the greatest female pole-vaulter of all time. Isinbayeva was banned from the 2016 Rio Olympics after revelations of an extensive state-sponsored doping programme in Russia, thus dashing her hopes of a grand retirement winning the Olympic gold medal. She retired from athletics in August 2016 after being elected to serve an 8-year term on the IOC's Athletes' Commission.

Isinbayeva has been a major champion on nine occasions (Olympic, World outdoor and indoor champion and European outdoor and indoor champion). She was also the jackpot winner of the IAAF Golden League series in 2007 and 2009. After poor performances at the World Championships in 2009 and 2010, she took a year-long break from the sport.

She became the first woman to clear the five-metre barrier in 2005. Her existing world record is 5.06 m outdoors, set in Zürich in August 2009. It is still unbeaten, as of 2024. Her 5.01 m indoors was the world record for just over a year. The latter was Isinbayeva's twenty-eighth pole vault world record.

Isinbayeva was named Female Athlete of the Year by the IAAF in 2004, 2005 and 2008, and World Sportswoman of the Year by Laureus in 2007 and 2009. In 2007 she entered in the FICTS "Hall of Fame" and was awarded with "Excellence Guirlande D'Honneur". She was given the Prince of Asturias Award for Sports in 2009. Isinbayeva is one of only eleven athletes (along with Valerie Adams, Usain Bolt, Veronica Campbell-Brown, Armand Duplantis, Jacques Freitag, Kirani James, Faith Kipyegon, Jana Pittman, Dani Samuels, and David Storl) to win World Championship titles at the youth, junior, and senior levels of an athletic event.

== Career ==
=== Early life and competition ===
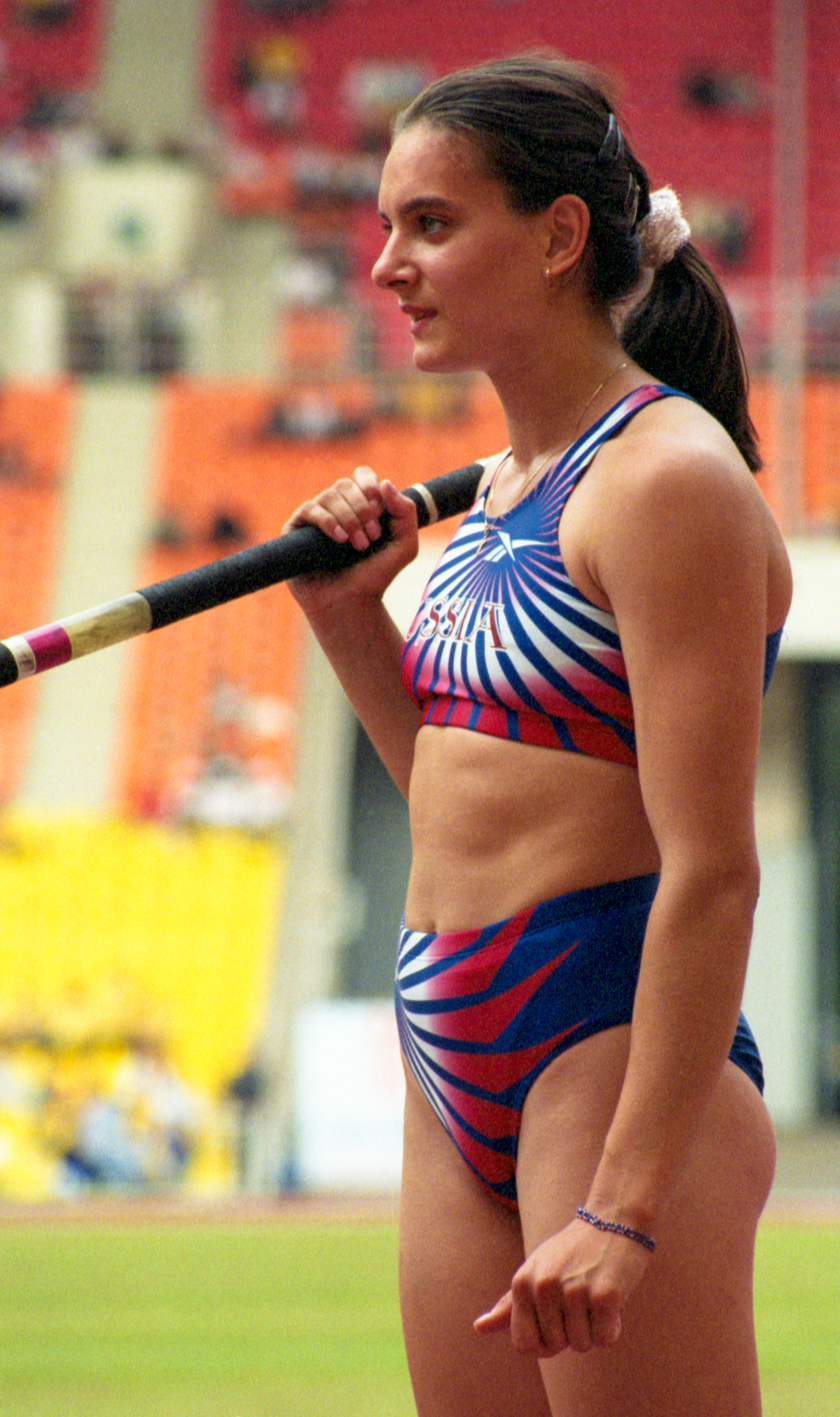
Isinbayeva at the 1998 World Youth Games in Moscow

Born to a Tabasaran father and a Russian mother in Volgograd, Isinbayeva trained as a gymnast from the age of 5 to 15. She ultimately left the sport because, as she grew, she was considered too tall to be competitive in gymnastics, ultimately attaining a height of 1.74 metres (5 ft 8.5 in).

Six months after having taken up pole-vaulting she won her first major victory at age 16 during the 1998 World Youth Games in Moscow, Russia with a height of 4.00 m. It was her third athletic competition. She jumped the same height at the 1998 World Junior Championships in Athletics in Annecy, France, but this left her 10 cm away from the medal placings.

In 1999, Isinbayeva improved on this height at the 1999 World Youth Championships in Athletics in Bydgoszcz, Poland when she cleared 4.10 m to take her second gold medal.

At the 2000 World Junior Championships in Athletics Isinbayeva again took first place clearing 4.20 m ahead of German Annika Becker. The same year the women's pole vault made its debut as an Olympic event in Sydney, Australia where Stacy Dragila of the United States took gold. In the same event Isinbayeva did not make it out of the qualifying round.

She won another gold medal in 2001, this time at the European Junior Championships with a winning height of 4.40 m.

Isinbayeva continued to improve and 2002 saw her clear 4.55 m at the 2002 European Athletics Championships, where she gained her first senior championship medal (silver), finishing 5 cm short of her compatriot Svetlana Feofanova.

=== First world records and Olympic title ===
2003 was another year of progression and saw Isinbayeva win the European Under 23 Championships gold with 4.65 m (in Bydgoszcz). On 13 July 2003, just about a month after her 21st birthday, Isinbayeva set her first world record at a meeting in Gateshead, England with a height of 4.82 m, which had made her the favourite to take gold at the 2003 World Championships in Athletics the following month. She ended up winning the bronze medal with Feofanova taking gold and Becker the silver.

At a meeting at Donetsk, Ukraine, Isinbayeva set a new indoor world record, with a height of 4.83 m only to see Feofanova increase this by two centimetres the following week. The following month at the Worlds Indoor Championships in March Isinbayeva broke Feofanova's record with a gold medal-winning jump of 4.86 m beating reigning indoor & outdoor champion Feofanova into bronze with reigning Olympic champion Dragila taking silver. The IAAF considered all three records to be over-all (outdoor) records, hence the indoor and outdoor records now stood at 4.86 m

27 June saw Isinbayeva return to Gateshead and improve the world record to 4.87 m. Feofanova responded the following week by breaking the record by a centimetre in Heraklion, Greece.

On 25 July in Birmingham, England, Isinbayeva reclaimed the record jumping 4.89 m and five days later in Crystal Palace, London, added a further centimetre to the record.

At the 2004 Summer Olympics in Athens, Isinbayeva won gold medal with a new world record height of 4.91 m. She subsequently broke the record later that year at the Memorial Van Damme in Brussels with a 4.92 m jump, her eighth world record of the season. Isinbayeva was named World Athlete of the Year for winning the Olympic & World Indoor title and breaking the World record eight times.

=== World and European champion ===
At the European Indoor Championships in Madrid, Spain Isinbayeva won gold with a new indoor world record of 4.90 m. In July 2005, Isinbayeva broke the world record four times over three separate meetings. First in Lausanne, Switzerland, she added an extra centimetre to her own mark clearing 4.93 m. It was the 14th world record of Isinbayeva's career coming just three months after she broke her own indoor mark (4.89 m) in Lievin. Eleven days later, in Madrid, Spain, she added an additional 2 cm to clear 4.95 m. In Crystal Palace, London on 22 July, after improving the record to 4.96 m, she raised the bar to 5.00 m. She then became the first woman in history to clear the once mythical five-metre barrier in pole vaulting, achieving the monumental mark with a single attempt.

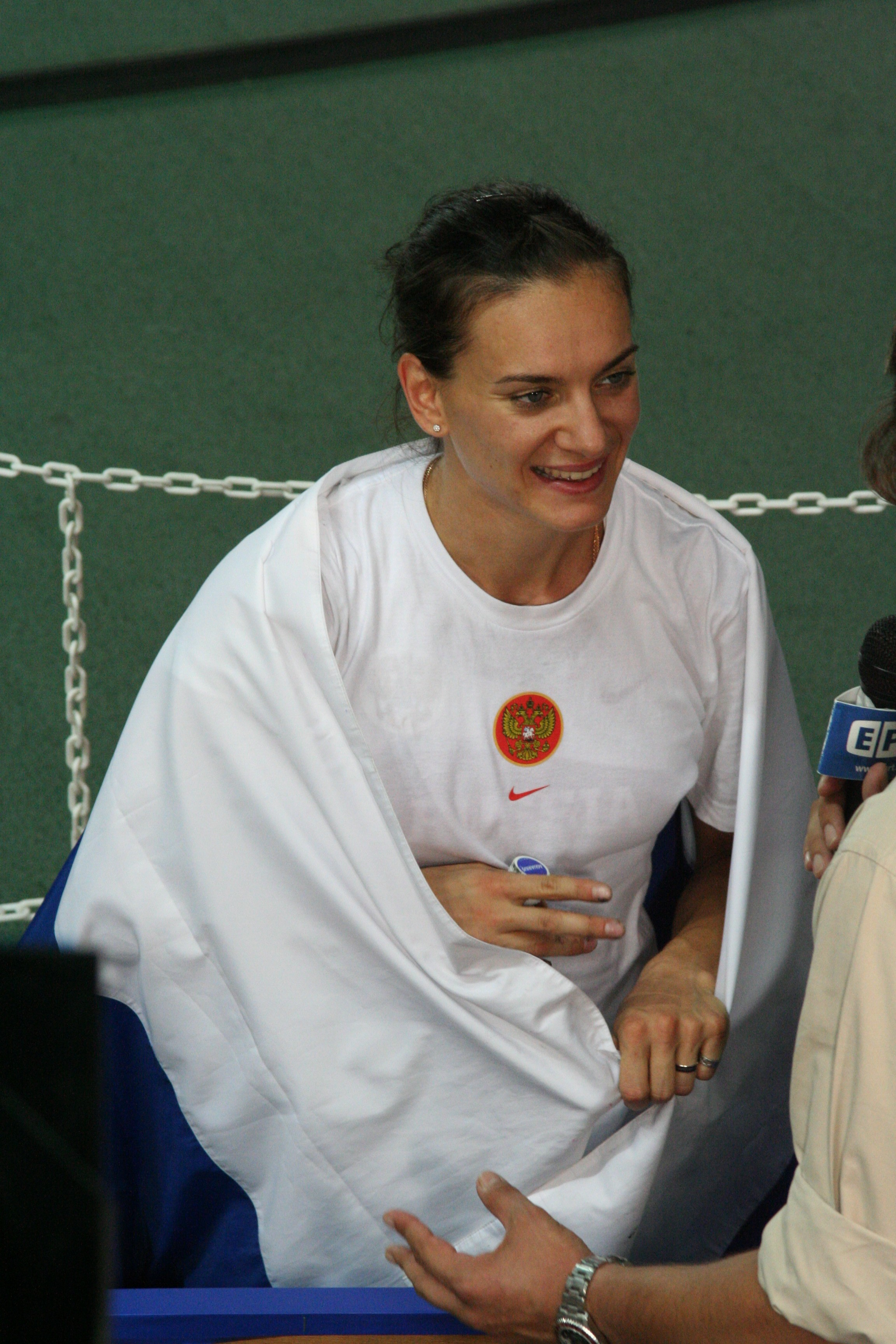
Isinbayeva being interviewed after her victory at the 2007 World Championships in Athletics in Osaka.

After the women's pole vault final at the 2005 World Championships in Helsinki, Finland was delayed due to extremely bad weather conditions, Isinbayeva once again broke her own world record, performing 5.01 m in her second attempt, and winning the competition with a 41 cm margin of victory, which was the greatest margin ever obtained in any World or Olympic competition for the event. This was already the eighteenth world record in the career of the then 23-year-old Isinbayeva and her successful season was crowned with her second consecutive World Athlete of the Year award.

At an indoor meeting on 12 February in Donetsk, Ukraine, Isinbayeva set a new indoor world record. She cleared 4.91 m. In March she successfully defended her World Indoor title in front of a homeland crowd in Moscow, Russia. During the 2006 European Athletics Championships in Gothenburg she won the gold medal with a CR of 4.80 metres. This was the only gold medal missing from her collection until that time. In September she won the World Cup, representing Russia, in Athens.

Isinbayeva was crowned Laureus World Sports Woman of the Year for the 2006 season.

=== Second world and Olympic golds ===
On 10 February 2007 in Donetsk, Ukraine, Isinbayeva broke the world indoor pole vault record again, by clearing 4.93 metres. It was Isinbayeva's 20th world record.

On 28 August 2007 Isinbayeva repeated as world champion in Osaka at the 2007 World Championships in Athletics with a 4.80 m performance, then failed three times at setting a new world record at 5.02 m. Her competition did no better than 4.75 m.

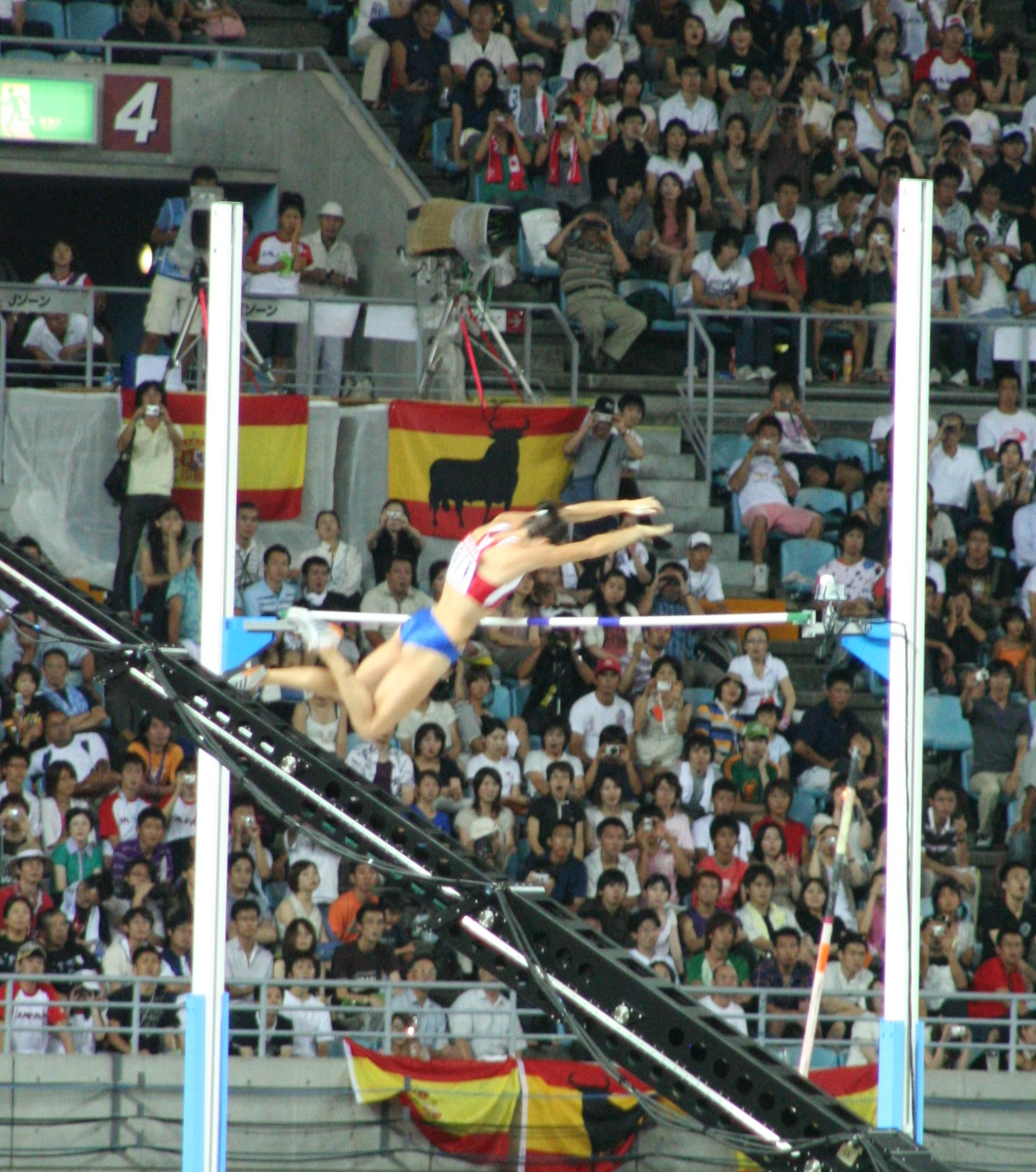
Isinbayeva passing the bar in Osaka

In 2007, she also won the IAAF Golden League Jackpot (which she shared with Sanya Richards) after having won all 2007 IAAF Golden League meetings. Isinbayeva was unbeaten in the 2007 season and won 18 out of 18 competitions.

During the indoor 2008 season, Isinbayeva set her twenty-first world record, clearing 4.95 metres on 16 February 2008 in Donetsk, Ukraine. A few weeks later, in Valencia, Spain, Isinbayeva won the World Indoor Championships over Jennifer Stuczynski. It was Isinbayeva's third consecutive World Indoor title.

On 11 July, at her first outdoor competition of the season, Rome's Golden Gala, Isinbayeva broke her own world record, clearing 5.03 metres. This was her first world record outdoors since the 2005 World Championships. Isinbayeva stated that she had tried 5.02 metres so many times unsuccessfully that her coach told her to change something and so she attempted 5.03 metres. This record came just as people began to speculate her fall from the top of pole vaulting, as American Jennifer Stuczynski cleared 4.92 metres at the American Olympic Trials. Isinbayeva stated that this motivated her to maintain her reputation as the world's greatest female pole vaulter. A few weeks later, at the Aviva London Grand Prix, Isinbayeva and Stuczynski competed together for the first time of the outdoor season. Isinbayeva won the competition, with Stuczynski finishing second. Both attempted a new world record of 5.04 metres. Isinbayeva was tantalizingly close on her final attempt, with the bar falling only after Isinbayeva had landed on the mat.

She successfully cleared that height on 29 July, in Monte Carlo, Monaco, her twenty-third world record.

At the 2008 Summer Olympics in Beijing on 18 August, Isinbayeva needed two vaults to prolong her Olympic title reign and went on to finish the competition with 5.05m, a world record at the time, her 24th world record.

On 23 November in Monaco, she was selected World Athlete of the Year by the IAAF for the third time in her career, along with Jamaican male sprinter Usain Bolt.

=== Break and return ===
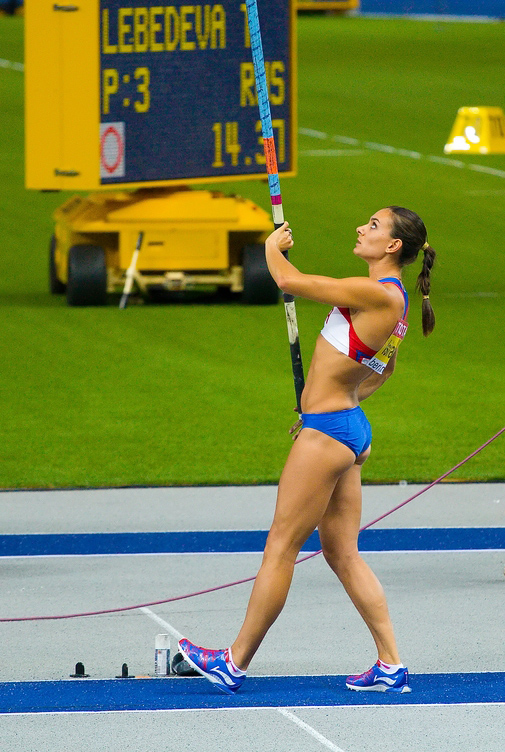
In competition at the World Championships in Berlin

Isinbayeva started the 2009 season by becoming the first woman to vault over 5 metres indoors. She first raised her world indoor mark with a vault of 4.97 m, then raised the bar to 5.00 m and cleared that height as well. The two marks were set at the Pole Vault Stars indoor meet, on 15 February, in Donetsk, Ukraine. It was the sixth consecutive year she had set an indoor world record in this meet. She received the Laureus World Sports Award for Sportswoman of the Year in recognition of her achievements – it was also the fifth time she had been nominated for the award in as many years.

At the 2009 World Championships in Berlin, Germany, Isinbayeva lost her second competition of the year after failing to achieve a successful vault. The world champion was Anna Rogowska who also beat her in the London Athletics Grand Prix in May. However, Yelena Isinbayeva broke her own women's pole vault world record at the Weltklasse Golden League meeting by clearing 5.06 m. On 2 September she was given the 2009 Prince of Asturias Award for Sports.

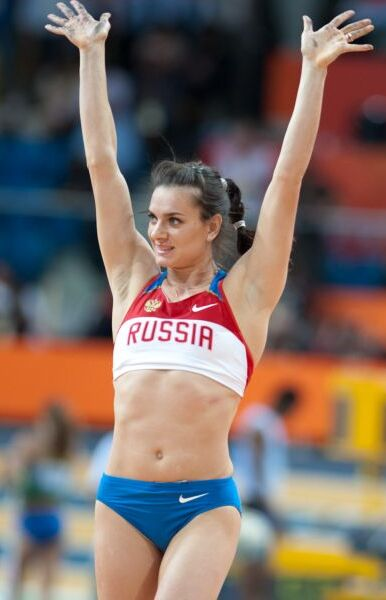
Isinbayeva at the 2010 IAAF World Indoor Championships in Doha

She hoped to put her World Championships no-mark performance behind her by aiming for a world indoor record at the 2010 IAAF World Indoor Championships. The Russian cleared her opening height of 4.60 m at the championships in Doha, but she faltered at 4.75 m and she ended up in fourth place and outside of the medals for a second consecutive time. Following another disappointment at a major championships, she decided to take time out from the sport to recuperate, saying: "A break from competing is absolutely necessary for me. After more than eight years of very hard training and competing at the highest levels both indoors and outdoors each year I need to step back in order for my body to properly recover".

She missed the opportunity to defend her title at the 2010 European Championships and she was succeeded by her compatriot Svetlana Feofanova, while Fabiana Murer went on to claim the inaugural Diamond League pole vault series. Isinbayeva continued to train with Vitaliy Petrov in Monaco during her time out, however, although did not appear in competition until the start of the 2011 indoor season. The Russian Winter Meeting in February 2011 was the venue for her comeback and she demonstrated her resurgence of form with a first time clearance of 4.81 m, comfortably defeating Feofanava.

In March 2011, Isinbayeva left her coach Vitaly Petrov and returned to Volgograd to her former mentor Yevgeny Trofimov, who had coached her since the age of 15 and until 2005. During the 2011 summer season she participated in only a few competitions and on 29 July she won the 2011 Diamond League meeting in Stockholm with a season best of 4.76 m. However, in the World Championships in Daegu she ended up again outside of the medals, taking the sixth place with 4.65 m.

She began 2012 with a clearance of 4.70 m at the Governor's Cup in Volgograd. At the 2012 Olympic Games, she easily qualified for the finals, where she came third with 4.70 m. She considered the bronze medal a success but mentioned that she would like to retire as acting Olympic champion. During the London Games she caused surprise and amusement in Britain when she was reported to have told Russian TV that the people of the UK were not interested in the Olympic Games and many Londoners were not even aware they were happening in their city.

In 2016, during the Russian nationals, she posted the world leading jump of 4.90 m following a ban of Russian track and field from the Olympics. The ban prevented her from taking part in the Rio Olympics, but she was elected to serve an 8-year term on the IOC's Athletes' Commission, after which she announced her retirement from athletics.

In December 2016, Isinbayeva became the chair of the supervisory board of the Russian Anti-Doping Agency.

== Activism and views ==
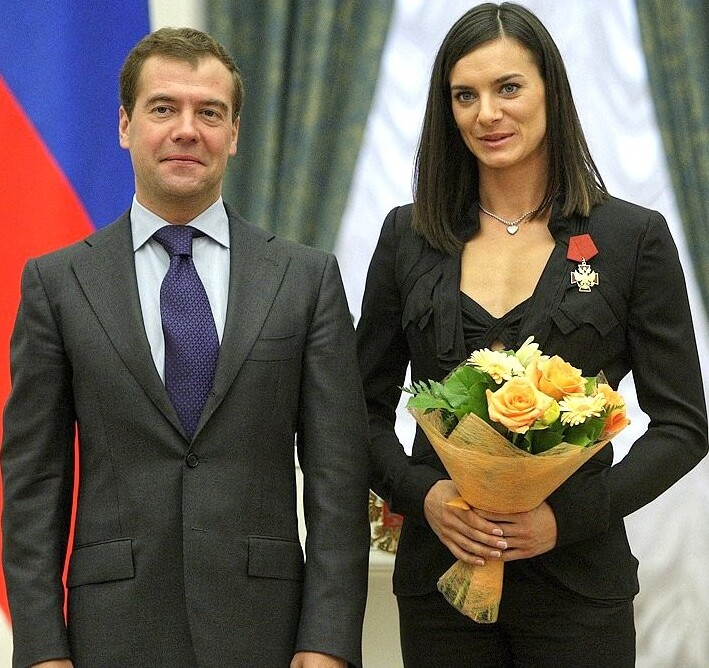
Isinbayeva with the Russian President Dmitry Medvedev in 2009

In 2012, Isinbayeva became an authorised representative for Vladimir Putin during the 2012 Russian presidential election. In November 2017, she joined PutinTeam, a social movement to support Putin and his 2018 Russian presidential campaign.

After the Court of Arbitration for Sport turned down an appeal by Russian athletes, Isinbayeva wrote, "Let all those pseudo clean foreign athletes breathe a sigh of relief and win their pseudo gold medals in our absence. They always did fear strength." She called for whistleblower Yuliya Stepanova to be "banned for life".

After she became chair of the Russian Anti-Doping Agency's supervisory board, IAAF taskforce chair Rune Andersen stated, "It is difficult to see how this helps to achieve the desired change in culture in track and field, or how it helps to promote an open environment for Russian whistleblowers", noting that Isinbayeva had called a WADA report "groundless" without reading it, publicly criticised whistleblowers (Andrei Dmitriev, Yuliya Stepanova, and Vitaliy Stepanov), and had not signed a pledge for clean sport or endorsed a Russian anti-doping group.

On 15 August 2013, Isinbayeva condemned homosexuality, called foreign athletes to "respect Russian traditions" and criticized athletes for supporting LGBT rights. She expressed support for a law banning "homosexual propaganda that targets children" in Russia, which had drawn sharp criticism from some representatives of the international community and had led activists to call for a boycott of the 2014 Winter Olympics in the Russian resort of Sochi. Isinbayeva was an ambassador for the games and welcomed athletes as a "mayor" of the Olympic Village at Sochi. She later released a statement through the IAAF, athletics' world governing body, saying that she was "misunderstood" due to poor English.

Earlier, Isinbayeva had made critical remarks in response to a gesture made by the Swedish high-jumper Emma Green Tregaro and others who had painted their fingernails in rainbow colours as an expression of support for gays and lesbians in Russia and in protest against recently passed laws banning what the Russian government described as propaganda for nontraditional sexual relations directed at minors. The Swedish Olympic Committee subsequently cautioned their athletes against engaging in the same type of demonstrations at the Sochi Olympics.

== Personal life ==
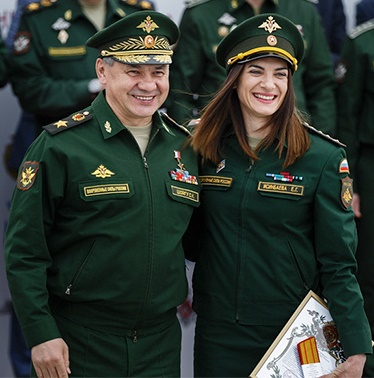
Isinbaeva receiving promotion to the rank of major from the Minister of Defence Sergei Shoigu (2015)

Her father, Gadzhi Gadzhiyevich Isinbayev, is a Tabasaran plumber while her mother, a shop assistant, is Russian. Isinbayeva also has a sister named Inna. Isinbayeva came from humble beginnings and remembers that her parents had to make many financial sacrifices in her early career.

She has two children: Eva, born 28 June 2014, and Dobrynya, born 14 February 2018. She married Eva's father, javelin thrower Nikita Petinov (b. 1990) shortly before their daughter's birth and had a wedding celebration on 12 December 2014. On 7 February 2014, Isinbayeva, while pregnant, was one of the final torch bearers for the 2014 Winter Olympics opening ceremony.

She has both a Bachelor's and Master's Degree after graduating from the Volgograd State Academy of Physical Culture. Currently she is continuing her post-graduate studies there and also studying at the Donetsk National Technical University.

In the Russian club competitions she represents the railroad military team; she is formally an officer in the Russian army, and on 4 August 2005 she was given the military rank of senior lieutenant before being promoted to captain in August 2008. In 2015, she was promoted to the rank of major and signed a five-year contract with the Russian Armed Forces.

On 2 December 2010, she gave a speech before the FIFA delegates in Zürich. Later on that occasion it was announced that Russia would host the 2018 FIFA World Cup.

Yelena Isinbayeva is now a member of the 'Champions for Peace' club, a group of 54 famous elite athletes committed to serving peace in the world through sport, created by Peace and Sport, a Monaco-based international organization.

In July 2023, it was reported by the Anti-Corruption Foundation that Isinbayeva had acquired Spanish citizenship and held multiple properties in Spain.

== International competitions ==
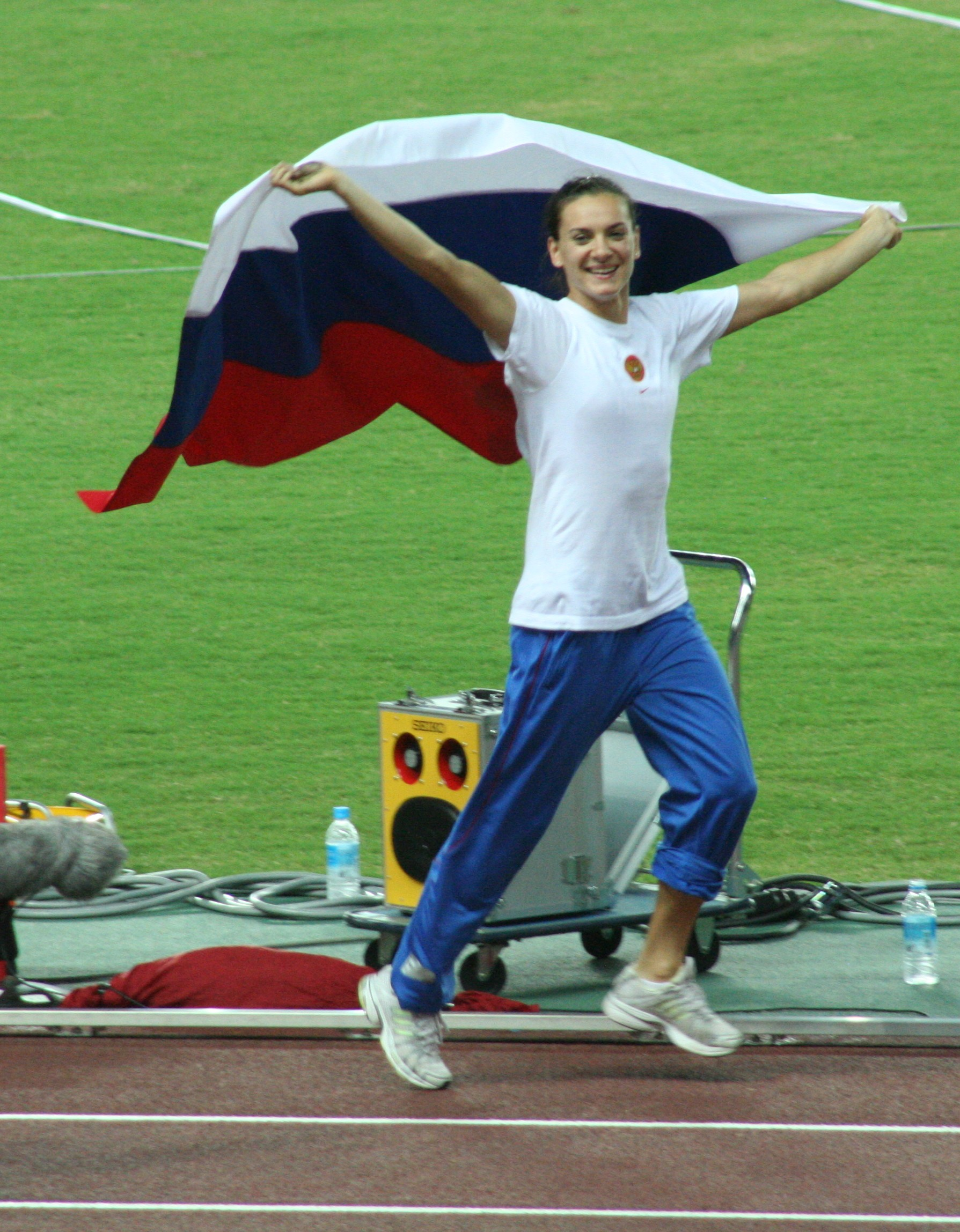
Isinbayeva celebrating her 2007 World Championships win.

Representing Russia
Year	Competition	Venue	Position	Result	Notes
1998	World Youth Games	Moscow, Russia	1st	4.00 m	
1998	World Junior Championships	Annecy, France	9th	3.90 m	
1999	World Youth Championships	Bydgoszcz, Poland	1st	4.10 m	WYR
1999	European Junior Championships	Riga, Latvia	5th	4.05 m	
2000	World Junior Championships	Santiago, Chile	1st	4.20 m	WJR
2001	European Junior Championships	Grosseto, Italy	1st	4.40 m	CR
2002	European Championships	Munich, Germany	2nd	4.55 m	
2003	World Indoor Championships	Birmingham, United Kingdom	2nd	4.60 m	
2003	World Championships	Paris, France	3rd	4.65 m	
2003	European U23 Championships	Bydgoszcz, Poland	1st	4.65 m	CR
2004	World Indoor Championships	Budapest, Hungary	1st	4.86 m	WR
2004	Summer Olympics	Athens, Greece	1st	4.91 m	WR
2004	IAAF World Athletics Final	Monte Carlo, Monaco	1st	4.83 m	
2005	European Indoor Championships	Madrid, Spain	1st	4.90 m	WRi
2005	World Championships	Helsinki, Finland	1st	5.01 m	WR
2005	IAAF World Athletics Final	Monte Carlo, Monaco	1st	4.74 m	
2006	World Indoor Championships	Moscow, Russia	1st	4.80 m	
2006	European Championships	Gothenburg, Sweden	1st	4.80 m	CR
2006	IAAF World Athletics Final	Stuttgart, Germany	1st	4.75 m	
2006	World Cup	Athens, Greece	1st	4.60 m	CR
2007	World Championships	Osaka, Japan	1st	4.80 m	
2007	IAAF Golden League	Various	1st	6/6 Wins	Jackpot winner
2007	IAAF World Athletics Final	Stuttgart, Germany	1st	4.87 m	CR
2008	World Indoor Championships	Valencia, Spain	1st	4.75 m	
2008	Summer Olympics	Beijing, China	1st	5.05 m	WR
2009	World Championships	Berlin, Germany	—	NM	
2009	IAAF Golden League	Various	1st	6/6 Wins	Jackpot winner
2009	World Athletics Final	Thessaloniki, Greece	1st	4.80 m	
2010	World Indoor Championships	Doha, Qatar	4th	4.60 m	
2011	World Championships	Daegu, South Korea	6th	4.65 m	
2012	World Indoor Championships	Istanbul, Turkey	1st	4.80 m	
2012	Summer Olympics	London, United Kingdom	3rd	4.70 m	
2013	World Championships	Moscow, Russia	1st	4.89 m	

== Results ==
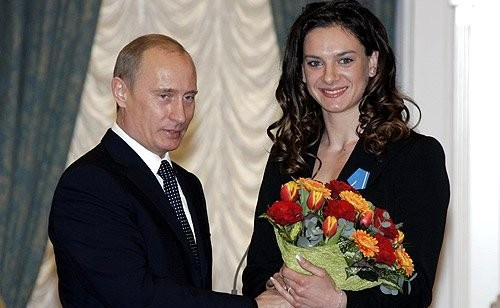
Isinbayeva with a winner's bouquet

2004

- 1st – 4.83 m – Pole Vault Stars, Donetsk, Ukraine
- 1st – 4.86 m – World Indoor Championships, Budapest, Hungary (WR)
- 1st – 4.87 m – IAAF Gateshead, Great Britain (WR)
- 1st – 4.89 m – Birmingham International Meeting, Great Britain (WR)
- 1st – 4.90 m – British Grand Prix London, Great Britain (WR)
- 1st – 4.91 m – Summer Olympics, Athens, Greece (WR)
- 1st – 4.92 m – Golden League Brussels, Belgium (WR)
- 1st – 4.83 m – 2nd World Athletics Final, Monte Carlo, Monaco

2005

- 1st – 4.87 m – Pole Vault Stars, Donetsk, Ukraine
- 1st – 4.90 m – European Indoor Championships, Madrid, Spain
- 1st – 4.93 m – IAAF Lausanne, Switzerland (WR)
- 1st – 4.95 m – Meeting de Madrid, Spain (WR)
- 1st – 5.00 m – IAAF London, Great Britain (WR)
- 1st – 4.79 m – IAAF Stockholm, Sweden
- 1st – 5.01 m – World Championships, Helsinki, Finland (WR)
- 1st – 4.93 m – Golden League Brussels, Belgium
- 1st – 4.74 m – 3rd World Athletics Final, Monte Carlo, Monaco

2006

- 1st – 4.91 m – Pole Vault Stars, Donetsk, Ukraine (iWR)
- 1st – 4.79 m – Norwich Union Grand Prix, Birmingham, Great Britain
- 1st – 4.72 m – Meeting Gaz de France du Pas-de-Calais, Lievin, France
- 1st – 4.80 m – World Indoor Championships, Moscow, Russia
- 1st – 4.76 m – IAAF Paris Saint-Denis, France
- 1st – 4.90 m – IAAF Lausanne, Switzerland
- 1st – 4.91 m – IAAF London, Great Britain
- 1st – 4.80 m – European Championships, Gothenburg, Sweden
- 1st – 4.81 m – Golden League Brussels, Belgium
- 1st – 4.75 m – 4th World Athletics Final, Stuttgart, Germany

2007

- 1st – 4.93 m – Pole Vault Stars, Donetsk, Ukraine (iWR)
- 1st – 4.91 m – Meeting Gaz De France, Paris, France
- 1st – 4.90 m – Golden League Rome, Italy
- 1st – 4.82 m – Norwich Union Super Grand Prix, London, Great Britain
- 1st – 4.80 m – World Championships, Osaka, Japan
- 1st – Golden League Brussels, Belgium
- 1st – 4.87 m – 5th World Athletics Final, Stuttgart, Germany

2008

- 1st – 4.95 m – Pole Vault Stars, Donetsk, Ukraine (iWR)
- 1st – 4.75 m – World Indoor Championships, Valencia, Spain
- 1st – 5.03 m – Golden Gala, Rome, Italy (WR)
- 1st – 5.04 m – Super Grand Prix, Monte Carlo, Monaco (WR)
- 1st – 5.05 m – Summer Olympics, Beijing, China (WR)
- 1st – 4.88 m – IAAF Zürich, Switzerland

2009

- 1st – 5.00 m – Pole Vault Stars, Donetsk, Ukraine (iWR)
- 1st – 4.82 m – Aviva Grand Prix, Birmingham, Great Britain
- 1st – 4.83 m – ISATF Berlin, Germany
- 1st – 4.65 m – Meeting Gaz de France, Paris, France
- 2nd – 4.68 m – Aviva London Grand Prix, London, Great Britain
- no height recorded – World Championships, Berlin, Germany
- 1st – 5.06 m – IAAF Golden League, Zürich, Switzerland (WR)

2010

- 1st – 4.85 m – Russian Winter Meeting, Moscow, Russia
- 1st – 4.85 m – Pole Vault Stars, Donetsk, Ukraine
- 4th – 4.60 m – World Indoor Championships, Doha, Qatar

2011

- 1st – 4.81 m – Russian Winter Meeting, Moscow, Russia
- 1st – 4.85 m – Pole Vault Stars, Donetsk, Ukraine
- 1st – 4.60 m – Night of Athletics, Heusden, Belgium
- 1st – 4.76 m – Diamond League, Stockholm, Sweden
- 6th – 4.65 m – World Championships, Daegu, South Korea

2012

- 1st – 5.01 m – XL-Galan, Stockholm, Sweden (iWR)
- 1st – 4.80 m – World Indoor Championships, Istanbul, Turkey
- 3rd – 4.70 m – Summer Olympic, London, Great Britain

2013

- 1st – 4.78 m – Ostrava Meeting, Ostrava, Czech Republic
- 1st – 4.75 m – Russian National Championship, Moscow, Russia
- 1st – 4.89 m – World Championships, Moscow, Russia

2016

- 1st – 4.90 m – Russian National Championship, Cheboksary, Russia

== World record progression by Isinbayeva ==
Yelena Isinbayeva has set 17 world records and 13 indoor world records. Several of her indoor world records were also ratified as world records.

World Records
Performance	Venue	Date
4.82 m	Gateshead, England	14 July 2003
4.83i m	Donetsk, Ukraine	15 February 2004
4.86i m	Budapest, Hungary	6 March 2004
4.87 m	Gateshead, England	27 June 2004
4.89 m	Birmingham, England	25 July 2004
4.90 m	London, England	30 July 2004
4.91 m	Athens, Greece	24 August 2004
4.92 m	Brussels, Belgium	3 September 2004
4.93 m	Lausanne, Switzerland	5 July 2005
4.95 m	Madrid, Spain	16 July 2005
4.96 m	London, England	22 July 2005
5.00 m	London, England	22 July 2005
5.01 m	Helsinki, Finland	12 August 2005
5.03 m	Rome, Italy	11 July 2008
5.04 m	Monaco	29 July 2008
5.05 m	Beijing, China	18 August 2008
5.06 m	Zürich, Switzerland	28 August 2009

Indoor World Records
Performance	Venue	Date
4.81 m	Donetsk, Ukraine	15 February 2004
4.83 m	Donetsk, Ukraine	15 February 2004
4.86 m	Budapest, Hungary	6 March 2004
4.87 m	Donetsk, Ukraine	12 February 2005
4.88 m	Birmingham, England	15 February 2005
4.89 m	Lievin, France	18 February 2005
4.90 m	Donetsk, Ukraine	26 February 2005
4.91 m	Madrid, Spain	6 March 2005
4.93 m	Donetsk, Ukraine	12 February 2006
4.95 m	Donetsk, Ukraine	10 February 2007
4.97 m	Donetsk, Ukraine	16 February 2008
5.00 m	Donetsk, Ukraine	15 February 2009
5.01 m	Stockholm, Sweden	23 February 2012

== Records list ==
(Records in bold are current ones.)

Record category	Performance	Venue	Date
World Youth Record	4.10 m	Bydgoszcz, Poland	18 July 1999
World Junior Championship	4.20 m	Santiago, Chile	8 October 2000
European Junior Championship	4.40 m	Grosseto, Italy	21 July 2001
World Junior Record	4.46 m	Berlin, Germany	2 August 2001
World Junior Record	4.47 m	Budapest, Hungary	10 February 2001
European U-23 Championship	4.65 m	Bydgoszcz, Poland	19 July 2003
Olympic Record	4.91 m	Athens, Greece	24 August 2004
**Olympic Record**	**5.05 m**	**Beijing, China**	**18 August 2008**
World Indoor Championships	4.86 m	Budapest, Hungary	6 March 2004
**World Championships**	**5.01 m**	**Helsinki, Finland**	**12 August 2005**
**European Indoor Championships**	**4.90 m**	**Madrid, Spain**	**6 March 2005**
European Championships	4.80 m	Gothenburg, Sweden	12 August 2006
World Record (Indoor)	5.01 m	Stockholm, Sweden	23 February 2012
**World Record (Outdoor)**	**5.06 m**	**Zürich, Switzerland**	**28 August 2009**
**IAAF Golden League**	**5.06 m**	**Zürich, Switzerland**	**28 August 2009**

== See also ==
- List of Olympic medalists in athletics (women)
- List of 2004 Summer Olympics medal winners
- List of 2008 Summer Olympics medal winners
- List of 2012 Summer Olympics medal winners
- List of World Athletics Championships medalists (women)
- List of IAAF World Indoor Championships medalists (women)
- List of European Athletics Championships medalists (women)
- List of European Athletics Indoor Championships medalists (women)
- List of pole vault national champions (women)
- List of members of the International Olympic Committee
- List of 2009 all-decade Sports Illustrated awards and honors
- List of Russian people
- List of Russian sportspeople
- List of people from Volgograd
- List of sportswomen
- Pole vault at the Olympics
- Pole vault at the World Championships in Athletics
- Five metres club

Records
Preceded by Stacy Dragila; Svetlana Feofanova; Svetlana Feofanova	Women's Pole Vault World Record Holder; 13 July 2003 – 20 February 2004; 6 March 2004 – 4 July 2004; 25 July 2004 –	Succeeded by Svetlana Feofanova; Svetlana Feofanova; Incumbent
Awards
Preceded by Hestrie Cloete	Women's Track & Field Athlete of the Year; 2004–2005	Succeeded by Sanya Richards
Preceded by Valentina Vezzali; Justine Henin	Gazzetta dello Sport; Sportswoman of the Year; 2005; 2008	Succeeded by Laure Manaudou; Federica Pellegrini
