= Elisabete Tavares Ansel =

Portuguese pole vaulter

Elisabete Ribeiro Tavares Ansel (born 7 March 1980 in Palencia, Spain) is a Portuguese athlete specialising in the pole vault. Born to Portuguese parents of Cape Verdean descent, she has two younger sisters who also compete in the pole vault, Sandra-Helena Tavares and Maria Leonor Tavares.

She has personal bests of 4.35 metres outdoors (Albi 2008) and 4.40 metres indoors (Pombal 2008).

== Competition record ==
Year	Competition	Venue	Position	Notes
Representing Portugal
1997	European Junior Championships	Ljubljana, Slovenia	17th (q)	3.30 m
1998	Ibero-American Championships	Lisbon, Portugal	8th	3.40 m
1998	World Junior Championships	Annecy, France	19th (q)	3.65 m
1999	European Junior Championships	Riga, Latvia	18th (q)	3.40 m
2000	European Indoor Championships	Ghent, Belgium	–	NM
2000	Ibero-American Championships	Rio de Janeiro, Brazil	3rd	3.90 m
2001	European U23 Championships	Amsterdam, Netherlands	16th (q)	3.80 m
2003	Universiade	Daegu, South Korea	4th	4.25 m
2004	Ibero-American Championships	Huelva, Spain	11th	3.80 m
2005	European Indoor Championships	Madrid, Spain	15th (q)	4.30 m
2005	World Championships	Helsinki, Finland	25th (q)	4.00 m
2006	European Championships	Gothenburg, Sweden	21st (q)	4.00 m
2007	World Championships	Osaka, Japan	33rd (q)	4.05 m
2008	World Indoor Championships	Valencia, Spain	12th (q)	4.25 m
2009	European Indoor Championships	Turin, Italy	16th (q)	4.05 m
