= Pole Vault Stars =

Annual pole vault competition

- Date: Early February
- Location: Donetsk, Ukraine
- Event type: Pole vault
- Established: 1990

Pole Vault Stars was an annual indoor pole vaulting competition which was typically held in February at the Druzhba Palace of Sports in Donetsk, Ukraine. The meeting was founded in 1990 by Sergey Bubka, the pole vault world record holder who grew up in the city. Bubka brought an end to his distinguished career with a ceremony at the competition in 2001.

== History ==
The meeting traces its history back to 1990, when Bubka set a world indoor record mark of 6.05 m. He went on to set two further world indoor records at the meet, clearing 6.11 m at the second edition in 1991 and then setting a world indoor record of 6.15 m in 1993. After standing for almost 21 years, in 2014 Renaud Lavillenie improved upon Bubka's record at Pole Vault Stars. Russian athlete Yelena Isinbayeva continued the event's record breaking traditions with two world record performances upon her first appearance in 2004. She set a new world record at the meet every year from 2004 to 2009. The Russian broke the women's indoor record twice at the 2009 meeting.

Zepter International was a long-time title sponsor of the event. The meeting's current commercial partner, Samsung, has been the title sponsor since 2011.

Days after the 2014 event, where Lavillenie set the new world record, the city of Donetsk became the epicenter of what became the War in Donbas. The continued situation has cancelled subsequent events. The 2015 event, moved from Donetsk to Kyiv, was cancelled at the last moment. Subsequently, in 2016 Lavillenie cooperated with Bubka to launch a new successor tournament to Pole Vault Stars called All Star Perche which takes place in France.

== Past winners ==
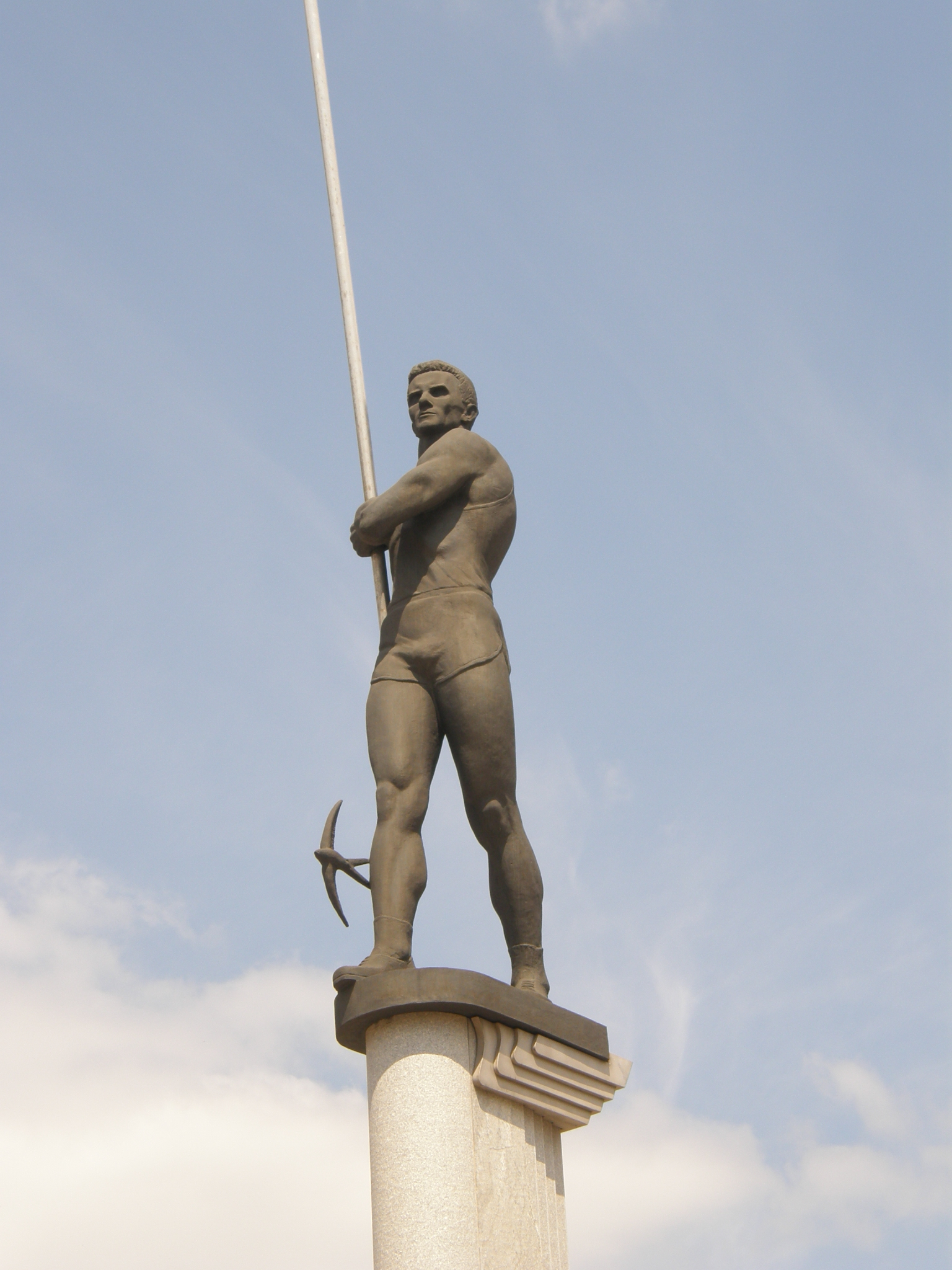
The statue of founder Sergey Bubka which stands in the host city of Donetsk.

Key: Meeting record

Winners at the Pole Vault Stars
| Year | Men's winner | Mark (m) | Women's winner | Mark (m) |
|---|---|---|---|---|
| 1990 | Sergey Bubka (UKR) | 6.05 | | |
| 1991 | Sergey Bubka (UKR) | 6.11 | | |
| 1993 | Sergey Bubka (UKR) | 6.15 | | |
| 2004 | Giuseppe Gibilisco (ITA) | 5.82 | Yelena Isinbayeva (RUS) | 4.83 |
| 2005 | Derek Miles (USA) | 5.85 | Yelena Isinbayeva (RUS) | 4.87 |
| 2006 | Paul Burgess (AUS) | 5.80 | Yelena Isinbayeva (RUS) | 4.91 |
| 2007 | Paul Burgess (AUS) | 5.80 | Yelena Isinbayeva (RUS) | 4.93 |
| 2008 | Maksym Mazuryk (UKR) | 5.81 | Yelena Isinbayeva (RUS) | 4.95 |
| 2009 | Steve Hooker (AUS) | 5.92 | Yelena Isinbayeva (RUS) | 5.00 |
| 2010 | Przemysław Czerwiński (POL) | 5.82 | Yelena Isinbayeva (RUS) | 4.85 |
| 2011 | Renaud Lavillenie (FRA) | 5.93 | Yelena Isinbayeva (RUS) | 4.85 |
| 2012 | Renaud Lavillenie (FRA) | 5.82 | Jiřina Ptáčníková (CZE) | 4.70 |
| 2013 | Renaud Lavillenie (FRA) | 5.85 | Yarisley Silva (CUB) | 4.76 |
| 2014 | Renaud Lavillenie (FRA) | 6.16 | Fabiana Murer (BRA) | 4.62 |
