= Fanni Juhász =

Hungarian pole vaulter (born 1981)

Personal information
- Born: 31 March 1981 (age 45) Budapest, Hungary
- Height: 1.73 m (5 ft 8 in)
- Weight: 62 kg (137 lb)

Sport
- Country: Hungary
- Sport: Track and field
- Event: Pole vault
- College team: University of Georgia
- Club: Gödöllői EAC
Medal record
Track and field
Representing Hungary
World Junior Championships
Bronze medal – third place	2000 Santiago	Women's pole vault

Fanni Juhász (born 31 March 1981) is a Hungarian pole vaulter who competes in international level events. Her greatest achievement was winning a bronze medal at the 2000 World Junior Championships in Athletics in Santiago, Chile.
