= 2009 European Athletics U23 Championships – Women's pole vault =

The women's pole vault event at the 2009 European Athletics U23 Championships was held in Kaunas, Lithuania, at S. Dariaus ir S. Girėno stadionas (Darius and Girėnas Stadium) on 16 and 18 July.

== Medalists ==
Gold	Lisa Ryzih; Germany
Silver	Minna Nikkanen; Finland
Bronze	Vanessa Vandy; Finland

== Results ==
=== Final ===
18 July

Rank	Name	Nationality	Attempts											Result	Notes
Rank	Name	Nationality	3.70	3.90	4.05	4.15	4.25	4.30	4.35	4.40	4.45	4.50	4.55	Result	Notes
1st place, gold medalist(s)	Lisa Ryzih	Germany	–	–	–	xo	–	o	–	o	x–	xo	x	4.50	
2nd place, silver medalist(s)	Minna Nikkanen	Finland	–	–	o	o	xo	o	o	o	o	xx–	x	4.45	
3rd place, bronze medalist(s)	Vanessa Vandy	Finland	–	–	o	o	xo	xxo	o	x–	xx			4.35	
4	Telie Mathiot	France	–	–	o	xo	o	xxx						4.25	
5	Alice Ost	France	–	o	o	xxo	xo	xxx						4.25	
5	Tina Šutej	Slovenia	–	o	o	xxo	xo	xxx						4.25	
7	Denise von Eynatten	Germany	–	–	o	o	xxx							4.15	
8	Anastasiya Savchenko	Russia	–	o	xxo	o	xxx							4.15	
8	Malin Dahlström	Sweden	–	o	xxo	o	xxx							4.15	
10	Elena Scarpellini	Italy	–	–	o	xo	xxx							4.15	
11	Romana Maláčová	Czech Republic	–	o	xo	xxx								4.05	
12	Emma Lyons	United Kingdom	ox	o	xxo	xxx								4.05	

=== Qualifications ===
16 July
Qualifying 4.20 or 12 best to the Final

==== Group A ====
Rank	Name	Nationality	Result	Notes
1	Lisa Ryzih	Germany	4.10	q
1	Elena Scarpellini	Italy	4.10	q
3	Vanessa Vandy	Finland	4.10	q
4	Alice Ost	France	4.10	q
4	Tina Šutej	Slovenia	4.10	q
6	Malin Dahlström	Sweden	4.00	q
7	Lembi Vaher	Estonia	4.00	
8	Hortense Lecuyot	France	4.00	
9	Daniela Höllwarth	Austria	3.85	
10	Fanny Berglund	Sweden	3.85	
11	Arlette Brülhart	Switzerland	3.70	
12	Giulia Cargnelli	Italy	3.70	

==== Group B ====
Rank	Name	Nationality	Result	Notes
1	Romana Maláčová	Czech Republic	4.10	q
1	Minna Nikkanen	Finland	4.10	q
1	Anastasiya Savchenko	Russia	4.10	q
4	Emma Lyons	United Kingdom	4.10	q
5	Denise von Eynatten	Germany	4.10	q
6	Telie Mathiot	France	4.10	q
7	Giorgia Benecchi	Italy	4.00	
8	Sonia Grabowska	Poland	3.85	
9	Isabell Lilja	Sweden	3.85	
10	Stella-Iro Ledaki	Greece	3.85	
11	Ángela Arias	Spain	3.70	
12	Ildze Bortaščenoka	Latvia	3.50	
13	Claire Wilkinson	Ireland	3.50	

== Participation ==
According to an unofficial count, 25 athletes from 17 countries participated in the event.

- Austria (1)
- Czech Republic (1)
- Estonia (1)
- Finland (2)
- France (3)
- Germany (2)
- Greece (1)
- Ireland (1)
- Italy (3)
- Latvia (1)
- Poland (1)
- Russia (1)
- Slovenia (1)
- Spain (1)
- Sweden (3)
- Switzerland (1)
- United Kingdom (1)
