= 2013 European Athletics Indoor Championships – Women's pole vault =

The Women's pole vault event at the 2013 European Athletics Indoor Championships was held on March 1, 2013 at 17:15 (qualification) and March 2, 16:10 (final) local time. The gold medal was won by British athlete Holly Bleasdale, who beat defending champion Anna Rogowska in a jump-off.

== Records ==
Standing records prior to the 2013 European Athletics Indoor Championships
World record	Elena Isinbaeva (RUS)	5.01	Stockholm, Sweden	23 February 2012
European record	Elena Isinbaeva (RUS)	5.01	Stockholm, Sweden	23 February 2012
Championship record	Elena Isinbaeva (RUS)	4.90	Madrid, Spain	6 March 2005
World Leading	Yarisley Silva (CUB)	4.78	Stockholm, Sweden	21 February 2013
European Leading	Holly Bleasdale (GBR)	4.77	Sheffield, Great Britain	9 February 2013

== Results ==
=== Qualification ===
Qualification: Qualification Performance 4.56 (Q) or at least 8 best performers advanced to the final.

Rank	Athlete	Nationality	3.96	4.16	4.36	4.46	4.56	Result	Note
1	Anastasia Savchenko	Russia	–	–	o	o	o	4.56	Q
2	Holly Bleasdale	Great Britain	–	–	xo	o	o	4.56	Q
3	Jiřina Svobodová	Czech Republic	–	–	o	o	xo	4.56	Q
4	Anzhelika Sidorova	Russia	–	o	o	xo	xo	4.56	Q, =PB
5	Angelina Zhuk-Krasnova	Russia	–	o	o	o	xx–	4.46	q
6	Kristina Gadschiew	Germany	–	–	xo	o	xx–	4.46	q
6	Anna Rogowska	Poland	–	–	xo	o	xxx	4.46	q
8	Katharina Bauer	Germany	–	xo	o	xxo	xx–	4.46	q, PB
9	Angelica Bengtsson	Sweden	–	xxo	o	xxo	xxx	4.46	SB
10	Nikoleta Kyriakopoulou	Greece	–	o	xo	xxx		4.36	
10	Romana Maláčová	Czech Republic	–	o	xo	xxx		4.36	
12	Roberta Bruni	Italy	–	xo	xo	xxx		4.36	
13	Minna Nikkanen	Finland	–	o	xxo	xxx		4.36	
13	Katerina Stefanidi	Greece	–	o	xxo	xxx		4.36	
15	Malin Dahlström	Sweden	–	o	xxx			4.16	
15	Caroline Bonde Holm	Denmark	–	o	xxx			4.16	
15	Cathrine Larsåsen	Norway	–	o	xxx			4.16	
15	Stélla-Iró Ledáki	Greece	o	o	xxx			4.16	
15	Tori Pena	Ireland	–	o	xxx			4.16	
20	Giorgia Benecchi	Italy	o	xo	xxx			4.16	

=== Final ===
The final was held at 16:10.

Rank	Athlete	Nationality	4.22	4.37	4.52	4.62	4.67	4.72	4.72	4.67	Result	Note
1st place, gold medalist(s)	Holly Bleasdale	Great Britain	-	o	o	x-	xo	xxx	x	o	4.67	
2nd place, silver medalist(s)	Anna Rogowska	Poland	-	o	xo	o	xo	xxx	x	x	4.67	SB
3rd place, bronze medalist(s)	Anzhelika Sidorova	Russia	o	o	o	o	xxx				4.62	PB
4	Jiřina Svobodová	Czech Republic	-	o	xo	o	xxx				4.62	
5	Anastasia Savchenko	Russia	-	xo	xxx						4.37	
5	Angelina Zhuk-Krasnova	Russia	o	xo	xxx						4.37	
7	Kristina Gadschiew	Germany	-	xxo							4.37	
8	Katharina Bauer	Germany	o	xxx							4.22	
