= 2011 European Athletics U23 Championships – Women's pole vault =

The Women's pole vault event at the 2011 European Athletics U23 Championships was held in Ostrava, Czech Republic, at Městský stadion on 15 and 17 July.

== Medalists ==
Gold	Holly Bleasdale; United Kingdom
Silver	Katerina Stefanidi; Greece
Bronze	Annika Roloff; Germany

== Results ==
=== Final ===
17 July 2011 / 15:15

Rank	Name	Nationality	Attempts															Result	Notes
Rank	Name	Nationality	3.80	3.90	4.00	4.10	4.20	4.25	4.30	4.35	4.40	4.45	4.50	4.55	4.60	4.65	4.66	Result	Notes
1st place, gold medalist(s)	Holly Bleasdale	United Kingdom	-	-	-	-	-	-	o	-	-	xo	o	o	-	-	xxx	4.55	
2nd place, silver medalist(s)	Katerina Stefanidi	Greece	-	-	-	xo	-	xo	-	xxo	-	xxo	-	xxx				4.45	PB
3rd place, bronze medalist(s)	Annika Roloff	Germany	-	-	o	o	o	-	xo	o	xxo	-	xxx					4.40	PB
4	Anna Katharina Schmid	Switzerland	-	-	xo	-	o	-	o	xxx								4.30	SB
5	Malin Dahlström	Sweden	-	-	-	o	-	o	xxx									4.25	
6	Anastasiya Savchenko	Russia	-	-	o	-	o	-	xxx									4.20	
7	Denise Groot	Netherlands	-	-	o	xxo	xo	xxx										4.20	
8	Leonie Schilder	Netherlands	xo	-	o	xo	xxo	xxx										4.20	=PB
9	Victoria von Eynatten	Germany	o	-	o	-	xxx											4.00	
10	Giorgia Benecchi	Italy	xxo	o	xxx													3.90	
11	Loréla Mánou	Greece	xo	xo	xxx													3.90	
	Katharina Bauer	Germany	-	-	-	-	xxx											NM	

=== Qualifications ===
Qualified: qualifying perf. 4.20 (Q) or 12 best performers (q) to the advance to the Final

==== Summary ====
Rank	Name	Nationality	Result	Notes
1	Holly Bleasdale	United Kingdom	4.15	q
1	Annika Roloff	Germany	4.15	q
3	Anna Katharina Schmid	Switzerland	4.15	q
3	Katerina Stefanidi	Greece	4.15	q
5	Giorgia Benecchi	Italy	4.15	q SB
5	Leonie Schilder	Netherlands	4.15	q
7	Denise Groot	Netherlands	4.15	q
8	Anastasiya Savchenko	Russia	4.15	q
9	Malin Dahlström	Sweden	4.15	q
10	Victoria von Eynatten	Germany	4.15	q
11	Loréla Mánou	Greece	4.15	q
12	Katharina Bauer	Germany	4.10	q
13	Marion Lotout	France	4.10	
14	Caroline Bonde Holm	Denmark	4.05	
15	Marta Onofre	Portugal	3.95	PB
15	Anaïs Poumarat	France	3.95	
17	Hortense Lecuyot	France	3.95	
18	Alessandra Lazzari	Italy	3.95	
19	Carla Franch	Spain	3.85	
19	Maarja Pärs	Estonia	3.85	PB
21	Miriam Galli	Italy	3.85	
22	Marta Casanova	Spain	3.85	
22	Iben Høgh-Pedersen	Denmark	3.85	
24	Anna Ivanova	Bulgaria	3.85	
25	Claire Wilkinson	Ireland	3.50	

==== Details ====
===== Group A =====
15 July 2011 / 10:10

Rank	Name	Nationality	Attempts							Result	Notes
Rank	Name	Nationality	3.50	3.70	3.85	3.95	4.05	4.10	4.15	Result	Notes
1	Annika Roloff	Germany	-	o	-	o	o	o	o	4.15	q
2	Anna Katharina Schmid	Switzerland	-	-	-	-	xo	o	o	4.15	q
2	Katerina Stefanidi	Greece	-	-	-	-	xo	o	o	4.15	q
4	Giorgia Benecchi	Italy	-	-	o	o	xo	xo	o	4.15	q SB
4	Leonie Schilder	Netherlands	-	-	o	o	o	xxo	o	4.15	q
6	Katharina Bauer	Germany	-	-	-	-	-	xo	xxx	4.10	q
7	Marion Lotout	France	-	-	o	o	o	xxo	xxx	4.10	
8	Caroline Bonde Holm	Denmark	-	-	-	-	o	-	xxx	4.05	
9	Marta Onofre	Portugal	o	o	o	o	xxx			3.95	PB
10	Carla Franch	Spain	-	o	o	xxx				3.85	
11	Marta Casanova	Spain	-	o	xo	xxx				3.85	
12	Anna Ivanova	Bulgaria	-	o	xxo	xxx				3.85	

===== Group B =====
15 July 2011 / 10:10

Rank	Name	Nationality	Attempts							Result	Notes
Rank	Name	Nationality	3.50	3.70	3.85	3.95	4.05	4.10	4.15	Result	Notes
1	Holly Bleasdale	United Kingdom	-	-	-	-	o	o	o	4.15	q
2	Denise Groot	Netherlands	-	-	-	xo	xxo	xxo	o	4.15	q
3	Anastasiya Savchenko	Russia	-	-	-	-	o	-	xo	4.15	q
4	Malin Dahlström	Sweden	-	-	-	-	xo	o	xo	4.15	q
5	Victoria von Eynatten	Germany	-	-	xo	o	xo	xo	xo	4.15	q
6	Loréla Mánou	Greece	-	-	xo	xo	o	xo	xxo	4.15	q
7	Anaïs Poumarat	France	-	-	o	o	xxx			3.95	
8	Hortense Lecuyot	France	-	xo	xo	o	xxx			3.95	
9	Alessandra Lazzari	Italy	o	o	o	xo	xxx			3.95	
10	Maarja Pärs	Estonia	-	o	o	xxx				3.85	PB
11	Miriam Galli	Italy	xo	o	o	xxx				3.85	
12	Iben Høgh-Pedersen	Denmark	-	-	xo	xxx				3.85	
13	Claire Wilkinson	Ireland	xo	xxx						3.50	

== Participation ==
According to an unofficial count, 25 athletes from 15 countries participated in the event.

- Bulgaria (1)
- Denmark (2)
- Estonia (1)
- France (3)
- Germany (3)
- Greece (2)
- Ireland (1)
- Italy (3)
- Netherlands (2)
- Portugal (1)
- Russia (1)
- Spain (2)
- Sweden (1)
- Switzerland (1)
- United Kingdom (1)
