= 2012 European Athletics Championships – Women's pole vault =

Women's pole vault at the European Athletics Championships

The women's pole vault event at the 2012 European Athletics Championships was held at the Helsinki Olympic Stadium on 28 and 30 June.

== Medalists ==
Gold	Jiřina Ptáčníková; Czech Republic
Silver	Martina Strutz; Germany
Bronze	Nikoleta Kyriakopoulou; Greece

== Records ==
Standing records prior to the 2012 European Athletics Championships
World record	Yelena Isinbayeva (RUS)	5.06	Zürich, Switzerland	28 August 2009
European record	Yelena Isinbayeva (RUS)	5.06	Zürich, Switzerland	28 August 2009
Championship record	Yelena Isinbayeva (RUS)	4.80	Gothenburg, Sweden	12 August 2006
World Leading	Fabiana Murer (BRA)	4.77	New York City, United States	9 June 2012
European Leading	Silke Spiegelburg (GER)	4.76	Prague, Czech Republic	11 June 2012

== Schedule ==
Date	Time	Round
28 June 2012	9:05	Qualification
30 June 2012	19:15	Final

== Results ==
=== Qualification ===
Qualification: Qualification Performance 4.45 (Q) or at least 12 best performers advance to the final

Rank	Group	Athlete	Nationality	3.80	3.95	4.05	4.15	4.25	4.35	4.40	4.45	Result	Notes
1	A	Jiřina Ptáčníková	Czech Republic	–	–	–	–	–	o	–	o	4.45	Q
2	B	Anastasia Savchenko	Russia	–	–	–	–	o	–	o	xxx	4.40	q
2	B	Silke Spiegelburg	Germany	–	–	–	–	–	–	o	xxx	4.40	q
2	A	Martina Strutz	Germany	–	–	–	–	o	o	o	x–	4.40	q
5	A	Aleksandra Kiryashova	Russia	–	–	–	–	xo	o	o	x–	4.40	q
5	B	Nikoleta Kyriakopoulou	Greece	–	–	–	–	xo	o	o	xxx	4.40	q
5	A	Anastasiya Shvedova	Belarus	–	–	–	–	o	xo	o	x–	4.40	q, SB
5	A	Katerina Stefanidi	Greece	–	–	–	o	xo	o	o	x–	4.40	q
9	A	Vanessa Boslak	France	–	–	–	–	o	xo	xo	x–	4.40	q
10	A	Jillian Schwartz	Israel	–	–	–	xo	o	xxo	xo	x–	4.40	q, SB
11	A	Angelica Bengtsson	Sweden	–	–	–	o	xo	o	xxo	–	4.40	q
11	A	Lisa Ryzih	Germany	–	–	–	–	–	xo	xxo	x–	4.40	q
13	B	Stélla-Iró Ledáki	Greece	–	–	o	o	o	o	xxx		4.35	
13	B	Monika Pyrek	Poland	–	–	–	–	o	o	xxx		4.35	
15	B	Nataliya Mazuryk	Ukraine	–	–	–	o	xo	xo	xxx		4.35	
16	B	Tori Pena	Ireland	–	–	–	o	o	xxo	xxx		4.35	
17	B	Maria Eleonor Tavares	Portugal	–	o	o	xo	o	xxx			4.25	
18	B	Romana Maláčová	Czech Republic	–	–	o	xo	xo	xxx			4.25	
19	A	Minna Nikkanen	Finland	–	–	xxo	–	xxo	xxx			4.25	
20	B	Cathrine Larsåsen	Norway	–	–	o	o	xxx				4.15	
20	B	Sally Peake	Great Britain	–	o	o	o	xxx				4.15	
22	A	Caroline Bonde Holm	Denmark	–	–	xo	xo	xxx				4.15	
23	A	Anna María Pinero	Spain	–	xo	–	xxo	xxx				4.15	
24	B	Tina Šutej	Slovenia	–	–	xxo	xxo	xxx				4.15	
25	B	Naroa Agirre	Spain	o	–	xo	xxx					4.05	
26	B	Malin Dahlström	Sweden	–	o	–	xxx					3.95	
27	B	Lembi Vaher	Estonia	o	xxo	xxx						3.95	SB
28	A	Gina Reuland	Luxembourg	xo	xxx							3.80	
	A	Nicole Büchler	Switzerland	–	–	–	xxx					NM	

=== Final ===
Rank	Athlete	Nationality	4.10	4.30	4.40	4.50	4.55	4.60	4.65	4.70	Result	Notes
1st place, gold medalist(s)	Jiřina Ptáčníková	Czech Republic	–	o	–	o	–	o	xxx		4.60	
2nd place, silver medalist(s)	Martina Strutz	Germany	–	xo	o	o	–	xo	xxx		4.60	SB
3rd place, bronze medalist(s)	Nikoleta Kyriakopoulou	Greece	–	xxo	o	xo	–	xxo	–	xxx	4.60	=SB
4	Silke Spiegelburg	Germany	–	–	o	o	–	xxx			4.50	
4	Anastasia Savchenko	Russia	–	o	–	o	–	xxx			4.50	
6	Vanessa Boslak	France	–	o	–	xo	–	xxx			4.50	=SB
7	Lisa Ryzih	Germany	–	–	xo	–	xxx				4.40	
8	Aleksandra Kiryashova	Russia	–	o	xxo	–	xxx				4.40	
9	Anastasiya Shvedova	Belarus	–	xxo	xxo	xxx					4.40	=SB
10	Angelica Bengtsson	Sweden	xo	o	xxx						4.30	
11	Jillian Schwartz	Israel	xo	xxx							4.10	
	Katerina Stefanidi	Greece	xxx								NM	
