= 2008 World Junior Championships in Athletics – Women's pole vault =

The women's pole vault event at the 2008 World Junior Championships in Athletics was held in Bydgoszcz, Poland, at Zawisza Stadium on 9 and 11 July.

== Medalists ==
| Gold | Valeriya Volik; Russia |
| Silver | Yekaterina Kolesova; Russia |
| Bronze | Katerina Stefanidi; Greece |

== Results ==
=== Final ===
11 July

| Rank | Name | Nationality | Result | Notes |
|---|---|---|---|---|
| 1st place, gold medalist(s) | Valeriya Volik | Russia | 4.40 | |
| 2nd place, silver medalist(s) | Yekaterina Kolesova | Russia | 4.40 | |
| 3rd place, bronze medalist(s) | Katerina Stefanidi | Greece | 4.25 | |
| 4 | Rachel Laurent | United States | 4.25 | |
| 5 | Vicky Parnov | Australia | 4.20 | |
| 6 | Vanessa Vandy | Finland | 4.20 | |
| 7 | Natasha Benner | Germany | 4.10 | |
| 8 | Petra Olsen | Sweden | 4.10 | |
| 8 | Leslie Brost | United States | 4.10 | |
| 10 | Ann Katrin Schwartz | Germany | 4.00 | |
| 11 | Hortense Lecuyot | France | 4.00 | |
| 12 | Ariane Beaumont-Courteau | Canada | 4.00 | |

=== Qualifications ===
9 July

==== Group A ====
| Rank | Name | Nationality | Result | Notes |
|---|---|---|---|---|
| 1 | Vicky Parnov | Australia | 4.00 | q |
| 1 | Ann Katrin Schwartz | Germany | 4.00 | q |
| 3 | Petra Olsen | Sweden | 4.00 | q |
| 4 | Yekaterina Kolesova | Russia | 4.00 | q |
| 5 | Leslie Brost | United States | 3.90 | q |
| 6 | Ariane Beaumont-Courteau | Canada | 3.90 | q |
| 7 | Jade Ive | United Kingdom | 3.90 | |
| 8 | Wu Yutong | China | 3.80 | |
| 8 | Agnieszka Kolasa | Poland | 3.80 | |
| 10 | Caroline Bonde Holm | Denmark | 3.65 | |
| 11 | Ángela Arias | Spain | 3.65 | |
| 12 | Marion Lotout | France | 3.65 | |

==== Group B ====
| Rank | Name | Nationality | Result | Notes |
|---|---|---|---|---|
| 1 | Valeriya Volik | Russia | 4.00 | q |
| 2 | Vanessa Vandy | Finland | 4.00 | q |
| 2 | Natasha Benner | Germany | 4.00 | q |
| 4 | Rachel Laurent | United States | 4.00 | q |
| 5 | Katerina Stefanidi | Greece | 3.90 | q |
| 6 | Hortense Lecuyot | France | 3.90 | q |
| 7 | Jesica Soto | Spain | 3.80 | |
| 8 | Rachel Birtles | Australia | 3.65 | |
| 8 | Giorgia Benecchi | Italy | 3.65 | |
| 8 | Joanna Michalska | Poland | 3.65 | |
| | Iben Høgh-Pedersen | Denmark | NH | |
| | Denise Groot | Netherlands | NH | |
| | Madeleine Nilsson | Sweden | NH | |

== Participation ==
According to an unofficial count, 25 athletes from 16 countries participated in the event.

- Australia (2)
- Canada (1)
- China (1)
- Denmark (2)
- Finland (1)
- France (2)
- Germany (2)
- Greece (1)
- Italy (1)
- Netherlands (1)
- Poland (2)
- Russia (2)
- Spain (2)
- Sweden (2)
- United Kingdom (1)
- United States (2)
