= Victoria Pena =

Victoria Pena may refer to:

- Vicky Peña, Catalan actress
- Tori Pena, Victoria Pena, Irish pole vaulter
