= Aleksandra Kiryashova =

Russian pole vaulter

Aleksandra Kiryashova Александра Киряшова
Personal information
- Full name: Aleksandra Aleksandrovna Kiryashova
- Born: 21 August 1985 (age 40) Leningrad, Soviet Union
- Height: 1.62 m (5 ft 4 in)

Sport
- Country: Russia
- Sport: Athletics
- Event: Pole vault

Achievements and titles
- World finals: 9th at the 2009 World Championships in Athletics
- Regional finals: 8th at the 2012 European Athletics Championships
- Personal best: Pole vault: 4.65m (2009, 2011)

Aleksandra Aleksandrovna Kiryashova (Russian: Александра Александровна Киряшова; born 21 August 1985 in Leningrad, Soviet Union) is a Russian pole vaulter. Her personal best jump is 4.65 metres.

== Achievements ==
Year	Competition	Venue	Position	Event	Notes
Representing Russia
2001	World Youth Championships	Debrecen, Hungary	2nd	Pole vault	4.00 m, =PB
2001	European Youth Olympics	Murcia, Spain	1st	Pole vault	4.00 m
2003	European Junior Championships	Tampere, Finland	3rd	Pole vault	4.15 m, SB
2004	World Junior Championships	Grosseto, Italy	—	Pole vault	NH
2007	European U23 Championships	Debrecen, Hungary	1st	Pole vault	4.50 m
2007	Universiade	Bangkok, Thailand	1st	Pole vault	4.40 m
2009	European Indoors	Turin, Italy	4th	Pole vault	4.50 m
2009	World Championships	Berlin, Germany	9th	Pole vault	4.40 m
2011	European Indoors	Paris, France	6th	Pole vault	4.60 m
2011	Universiade	Shenzhen, China	1st	Pole vault	4.65 m, =PB
2012	European Championships	Helsinki, Finland	8th	Pole vault	4.40 m
2013	Universiade	Kazan, Russia	7th	Pole vault	4.20 m
