= Marion Lotout =

French pole vaulter

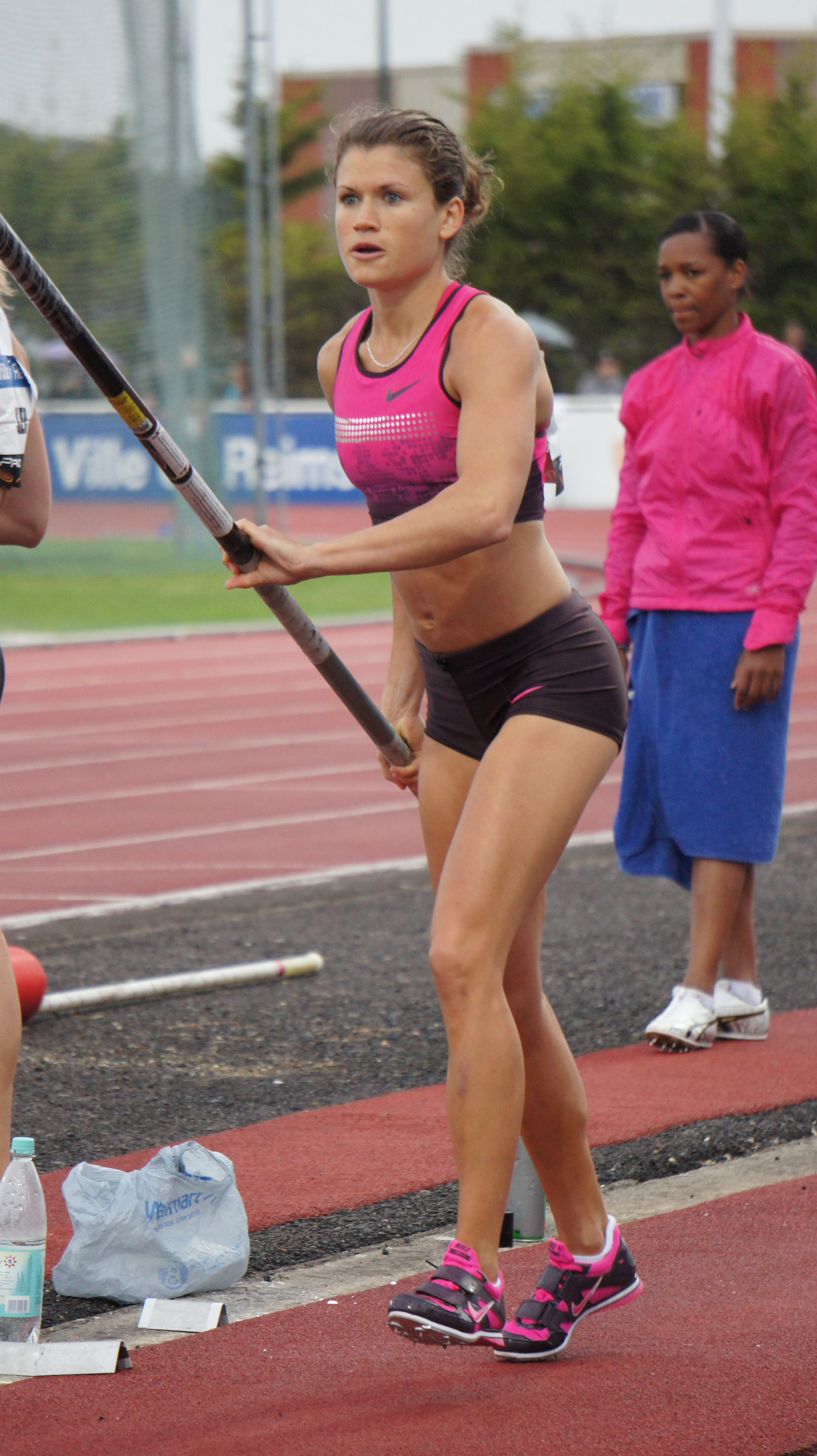

Personal information
- Born: 19 November 1989 (age 36) Saint-Brieuc, France
- Height: 1.65 m (5 ft 5 in)
- Weight: 50 kg (110 lb)

Sport
- Sport: Athletics
- Event: Pole vault

Marion Lotout (born 19 November 1989) is a French athlete who competes in the pole vault. She competed in the Women's pole vault at the 2012 Summer Olympics. She has personal bests of 4.60 metres outdoors (2013) and 4.56 metres indoors (2014).

== Competition record ==
Year	Competition	Venue	Position	Notes
Representing France
2008	World Junior Championships	Bydgoszcz, Poland	22nd (q)	3.65 m
2011	European U23 Championships	Ostrava, Czech Republic	13th (q)	4.10 m
2011	Universiade	Shenzhen, China	8th	4.25 m
2012	Olympic Games	London, United Kingdom	33rd (q)	4.10 m
2013	World Championships	Moscow, Russia	12th	4.45 m
2013	Jeux de la Francophonie	Nice, France	1st	4.40 m
2014	European Championships	Zürich, Switzerland	12th (q)	4.45 m
2015	World Championships	Beijing, China	21st (q)	4.30 m
2017	Jeux de la Francophonie	Abidjan, Ivory Coast	2nd	4.00 m
2018	Mediterranean Games	Tarragona, Spain	–	NM
2018	European Championships	Berlin, Germany	15th (q)	4.35 m
