= Vicky Parnov =

Australian pole vaulter

Personal information
- Born: 24 October 1990 (age 35) Moscow, Soviet Union
Medal record
Women's Athletics
Representing Australia
World Youth Championships
Gold medal – first place	2007 Ostrava	Pole Vault

Vicky Parnov (born 24 October 1990 in Moscow, Soviet Union) is an Australian athlete who competes in pole vault. She has strong athletic pedigree, being the niece of Tatiana Grigorieva, who won the silver medal for Australia in the women's pole vault at the 2000 Summer Olympics, and the granddaughter of Natalya Pechonkina, who won the bronze medal for the USSR in the women's 400m at the 1968 Summer Olympics. She is coached by her father Alex Parnov, himself a former world class pole vaulter. Her younger sister Liz also competes in Pole Vault and was the Australian national champion in 2010 before she turned 16.

Vicky moved to Australia with her family in 1996, at the age of six, and was inspired to take up pole vaulting at the age of nine, after watching her aunt win a silver medal in the event at the Sydney Olympics. Her first international experience came at the age of 14, when she represented Australia at the 2005 World Youth Championships in Marrakesh, placing fourth. At the following edition of the championships, the 2007 World Youths, held in Ostrava, she won gold in the pole vault with a jump of 4.35m. She has also competed in two editions of the World Junior Championships, claiming the bronze medal in 2006, and represented Australia at open level during the 2006 Commonwealth Games in Melbourne, and the 2007 World Championships in Osaka. When she competed in the women's pole vault at the 2007 World Championships, she became the youngest athlete to ever represent Australia at World Championship level, aged 16 years and 305 days.

In 2007, she was selected Asics Junior Athlete of the Year.

Her personal best of 4.40 metres, achieved in June 2007 at Saulheim, was the Australian under-20 record until it was tied by her sister in April 2010 then surpassed in February 2012.

== Achievements ==
Year	Competition	Venue	Position	Notes
Representing Australia
2005	World Youth Championships	Marrakesh, Morocco	4th	4.10m
2006	Commonwealth Games	Melbourne, Australia	6th	4.25m
2006	World Junior Championships	Beijing, China	3rd	4.20 m
2007	World Youth Championships	Ostrava, Czech Republic	1st	4.35m
2007	World Championships	Osaka, Japan	Qualifying	4.05m
2008	World Junior Championships	Bydgoszcz, Poland	5th	4.20 m

== See also ==
- 2007 World Championships in Athletics – Women's pole vault
- Athletics in Australia
