= 2017 European Athletics Indoor Championships – Women's pole vault =

The women's pole vault event at the 2017 European Athletics Indoor Championships was held on 4 March at 18:05 local time.

== Medalists ==
Gold	Silver	Bronze
Katerina Stefanidi; Greece	Lisa Ryzih; Germany	Angelica Bengtsson; Sweden; Maryna Kylypko; Ukraine

== Records ==
Standing records prior to the 2017 European Athletics Indoor Championships
World record	Jenn Suhr (USA)	5.02	Albuquerque, United States	2 March 2013
European record	Yelena Isinbayeva (RUS)	5.01	Stockholm, Sweden	23 February 2012
Championship record	Yelena Isinbayeva (RUS)	4.90	Madrid, Spain	6 March 2005
World Leading	Katerina Stefanidi (GRE)	4.82	New York, United States	11 February 2017
European Leading	Katerina Stefanidi (GRE)	4.82	New York, United States	11 February 2017

== Results ==
=== Final ===
Rank	Athlete	Nationality	4.25	4.40	4.55	4.65	4.70	4.75	4.80	4.85	4.91	Result	Note
1st place, gold medalist(s)	Katerina Stefanidi	Greece	–	–	xo	o	–	–	o	o	xxx	4.85	WL
2nd place, silver medalist(s)	Lisa Ryzih	Germany	–	o	o	o	o	o	x-	xx		4.75	PB
3rd place, bronze medalist(s)	Angelica Bengtsson	Sweden	o	o	o	xxx						4.55	
3rd place, bronze medalist(s)	Maryna Kylypko	Ukraine	o	o	o	xxx						4.55	
5	Michaela Meijer	Sweden	xo	o	o	xxx						4.55	
6	Lisa Gunnarsson	Sweden	o	o	xo	xxx						4.55	
6	Minna Nikkanen	Finland	o	o	xo	xxx						4.55	
8	Wilma Murto	Finland	o	o	xxx							4.40	
8	Tina Šutej	Slovenia	o	o	xxx							4.40	
10	Annika Roloff	Germany	xo	o	xxx							4.40	
11	Angelica Moser	Switzerland	o	xo	xxx							4.40	SB
12	Iryna Yakaltsevich	Belarus	xo	xo	xxx							4.40	
13	Romana Maláčová	Czech Republic	–	xxo	xxx							4.40	
