= 2007 European Athletics U23 Championships – Women's pole vault =

The women's pole vault event at the 2007 European Athletics U23 Championships was held in Debrecen, Hungary, at Gyulai István Atlétikai Stadion on 12 and 14 July.

== Medalists ==
Gold	Aleksandra Kiryashova; Russia
Silver	Anna Schultze; Germany
Bronze	Anna Battke; Germany

== Results ==
=== Final ===
14 July

Rank	Name	Nationality	Attempts											Result	Notes
Rank	Name	Nationality	3.90	4.00	4.10	4.20	4.25	4.30	4.35	4.40	4.45	4.50	4.55	Result	Notes
1st place, gold medalist(s)	Aleksandra Kiryashova	Russia	–	–	–	o	–	xo	–	o	o	o	xxx	4.50	
2nd place, silver medalist(s)	Anna Schultze	Germany	–	–	o	–	xxo	–	xo	xxx				4.35	
3rd place, bronze medalist(s)	Anna Battke	Germany	–	–	–	–	o	–	xxo	xx–	x			4.35	
4	Silke Spiegelburg	Germany	–	–	–	–	xxo	–	xx–	x				4.25	
5	Paulina Dębska	Poland	–	o	–	xo	–	xxx						4.20	
6	Chloé Mourand	France	o	o	o	xxx								4.10	
6	Rianna Galiart	Netherlands	o	–	o	xxx								4.10	
8	Louise Butterworth	United Kingdom	o	xo	o	xxx								4.10	
9	Cathrine Larsåsen	Norway	–	xxo	o	xxx								4.10	
10	Emma Lyons	United Kingdom	o	xxo	xxo	xxx								4.10	
11	Alixe Auvray	France	o	o	xxx									4.00	
12	Romana Maláčová	Czech Republic	o	xxo	xxx									4.00	

=== Qualifications ===
12 July
Qualifying 4.15 or 12 best to the Final

==== Group A ====
Rank	Name	Nationality	Result	Notes
1	Aleksandra Kiryashova	Russia	4.15	Q
2	Anna Schultze	Germany	4.15	Q
2	Silke Spiegelburg	Germany	4.15	Q
4	Romana Maláčová	Czech Republic	4.05	q
4	Emma Lyons	United Kingdom	4.05	q
6	Alixe Auvray	France	4.05	q
7	Katarzyna Sowa	Poland	3.95	
8	Enikő Erős	Hungary	3.65	
9	Moran Azizi	Israel	3.65	
10	Anna Palou	Spain	3.55	
10	Tiina Taavitsainen	Finland	3.55	
	Daniela Höllwarth	Austria	NM	

==== Group B ====
Rank	Name	Nationality	Result	Notes
1	Cathrine Larsåsen	Norway	4.15	Q
1	Anna Battke	Germany	4.15	Q
3	Chloé Mourand	France	4.15	Q
4	Paulina Dębska	Poland	4.05	q
4	Rianna Galiart	Netherlands	4.05	q
6	Louise Butterworth	United Kingdom	4.05	q
7	Maria Eleonor Tavares	Portugal	3.95	
7	Anna María Pinero	Spain	3.95	
9	Elena Scarpellini	Italy	3.95	
10	Telie Mathiot	France	3.85	
11	Eeva Niemelä	Finland	3.75	
12	Isabell Lilja	Sweden	3.65	

== Participation ==
According to an unofficial count, 24 athletes from 16 countries participated in the event.

- Austria (1)
- Czech Republic (1)
- Finland (2)
- France (3)
- Germany (3)
- Hungary (1)
- Israel (1)
- Italy (1)
- Netherlands (1)
- Norway (1)
- Poland (2)
- Portugal (1)
- Russia (1)
- Spain (2)
- Sweden (1)
- United Kingdom (2)
