= Cathrine Larsåsen =

Norwegian pole vaulter (born 1986)

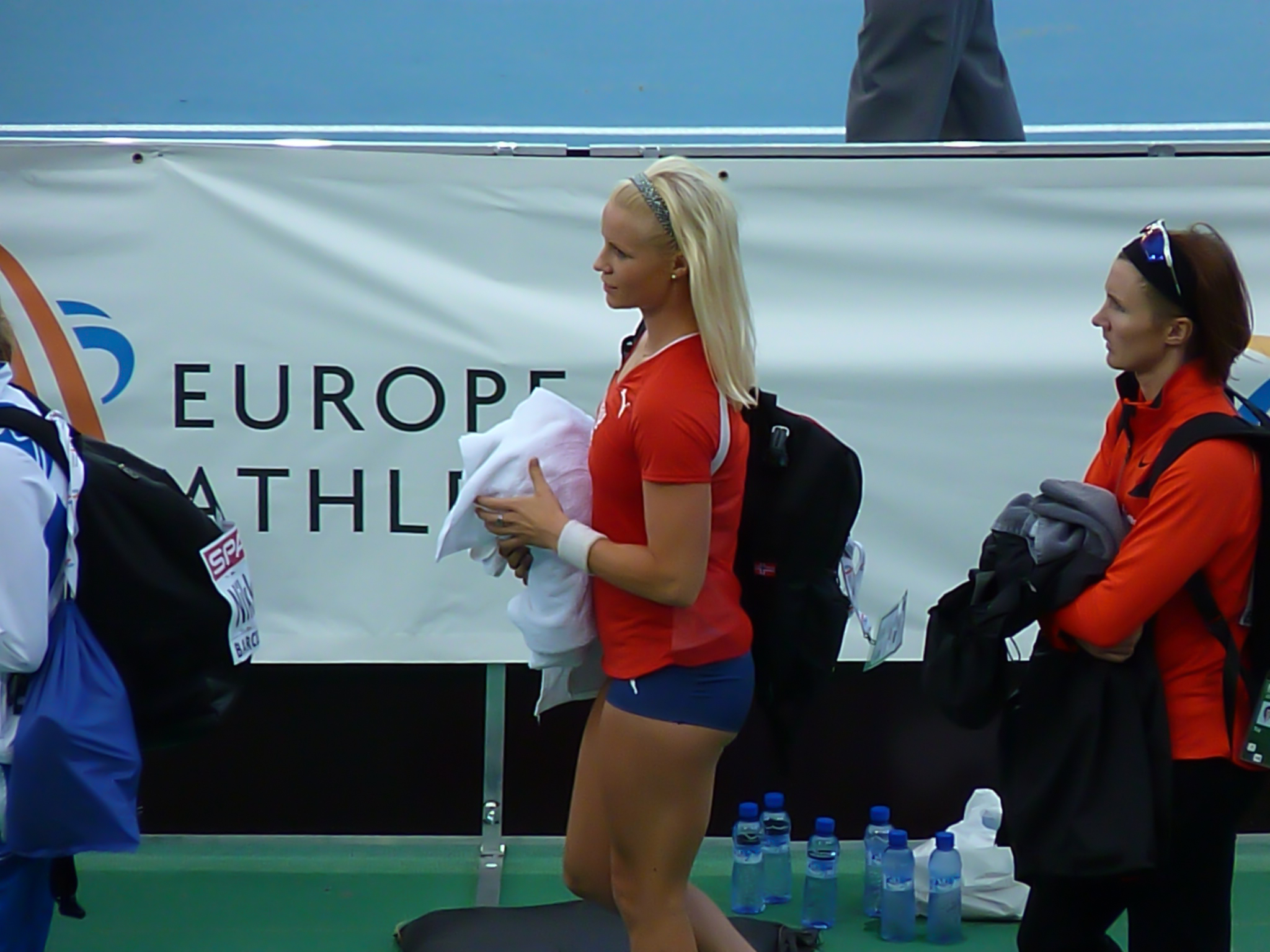
Cathrine Larsåsen

Cathrine Larsåsen (born 5 December 1986) is a Norwegian pole vaulter.

She hails from Oslo and represents the club IL i BUL. She won the Norwegian championships ten times in a row between 2004 and 2013.

Her first international outing came at the 2007 European U23 Championships where she finished ninth with 4.10 metres. She equalled her own Norwegian record in the qualification, with 4.15 metres. Larsåsen had previously set five Norwegian outdoor records, and before the year was over she improved it to 4.21 metres at the Norwegian junior championships in Tønsberg.

In 2008 and 2009, she improved gradually. At the 2008 Norwegian championships she improved the record to 4.30 metres, and was awarded the King's Cup. The 2009 European Indoor Championships where she was knocked out in the qualification was her only international outing. Larsåsen then finished eighth at the 2010 European Championships. After jumping 4.30 and 4.31 indoors, she set a series of Norwegian records during the summer, with 4.30 (equalled), 4.33, 4.34 and then 4.35 twice at the European Championships.

At the 2011 Danish indoor championships she equalled her 4.35 mark before improving it to 4.40 in August 2011 and 4.41 in February 2012. Internationally, she failed to reach the final in a series of competitions, recording heights of 4.15 at the 2011 European Indoor Championships, no mark at the 2011 World Championships, 4.15 at the 2012 European Championships and 2013 European Indoor Championships.

Since 2010 Larsåsen has resided in Copenhagen as a cohabitant of Danish long jumper Morten Jensen. In July 2014 the couple announced that Larsåsen was pregnant and would take a break from athletics competitions. She also reached the semi-final in 2012's edition of Skal vi danse?.
