= Caroline Bonde Holm =

Danish pole vaulter (born 1990)

Personal information
- Born: 19 July 1990 (age 35) Hørsholm, Denmark
- Height: 1.78 m (5 ft 10 in)
- Weight: 68 kg (150 lb)

Sport
- Sport: Pole vault

Caroline Bonde Holm (born 19 July 1990) is a Danish athlete who competes in the pole vault. She competed in the Women's pole vault at the 2012 Summer Olympics.

== Competition record ==
Year	Competition	Venue	Position	Notes
Representing Denmark
2007	World Youth Championships	Ostrava, Czech Republic	20th (q)	3.50 m
2008	World Junior Championships	Bydgoszcz, Poland	17th (q)	3.65 m
2009	European Indoor Championships	Turin, Italy	17th (q)	4.05 m
2009	European Junior Championships	Novi Sad, Serbia	3rd	4.10 m
2010	European Championships	Barcelona, Spain	20th (q)	4.15 m
2011	European Indoor Championships	Paris, France	15th (q)	4.15 m
2011	European U23 Championships	Ostrava, Czech Republic	14th (q)	4.05 m
2011	World Championships	Daegu, South Korea	25th (q)	4.25 m
2012	World Indoor Championships	Istanbul, Turkey	–	NM
2012	European Championships	Helsinki, Finland	22nd (q)	4.15 m
2012	Olympic Games	Helsinki, Finland	–	NM
2013	European Indoor Championships	Gothenburg, Sweden	15th (q)	4.16 m
2014	European Championships	Zürich, Switzerland	23rd (q)	4.25 m
2022	European Championships	Munich, Germany	4th	4.55 m
2023	European Indoor Championships	Istanbul, Turkey	13th (q)	4.45 m
2023	World Championships	Budapest, Hungary	24th (q)	4.35 m
2024	European Championships	Rome, Italy	23rd (q)	4.25 m
