= Elena Scarpellini =

Italian pole vaulter (born 1987)

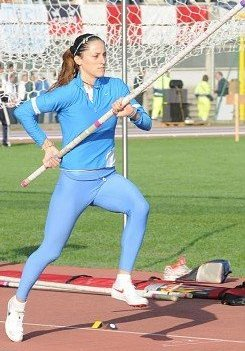
- Elena Scarpellini in 2010

Personal information
- Nationality: Italian
- Born: 14 January 1987 (age 39) Bergamo, [Italy
- Height: 1.77 m (5 ft 9 1/2 in)
- Weight: 60 kg (130 lb)

Sport
- Country: Italy
- Sport: Athletics
- Event: Pole vault
- Club: C.S. Aeronautica Militare
- Coached by: Emanuel Margesin

Achievements and titles
- Personal best: Pole vault: 4.40 (2010)

Elena Scarpellini (born 14 January 1987 in Bergamo) is an Italian pole vaulter. Her best result at international senior level was ninth place at the 2010 IAAF World Indoor Championships. In the season 2018-2019 she also competed as skeleton racer.

== Biography ==
Like many other pole vaulters, Scarpellini has a background in artistic gymnastics. She has six caps in national team, beginning from 2005. She is a four-time winner at the Italian championships.

She had her best year in 2010: in addition to breaking the national indoor record, she was fourth at the 2010 European Team Championships.

== National records ==
- Pole vault indoor: 4.40 m (6 February 2010) - holder until 6 February 2010.

== Personal bests ==
- Pole vault outdoor: 4.36 m (2012)
- Pole vault indoor: 4.40 m (2010)

Pole vault outdoor progression
Year	Performance	World ranking
2012	4.36	50th
2011	4.20	104th
2010	3.85	n/a

== Achievements ==
Year	Competition	Venue	Position	Notes
2004	World Junior Championships	Grosseto, Italy	7th	3.95 m
2005	European Junior Championships	Kaunas, Lithuania	3rd	4.15 m
2006	World Junior Championships	Beijing, China	10th	3.80 m
2007	European U23 Championships	Debrecen, Hungary	16th (q)	3.95 m
2009	European Indoor Championships	Turin, Italy	13th (q)	4.25 m
2009	Mediterranean Games	Pescara, Italy	6th	4.00 m
2009	European U23 Championships	Kaunas, Lithuania	10th	4.15 m
2010	World Indoor Championships	Doha, Qatar	9th	4.35 m
2010	European Championships	Barcelona, Spain	22nd (q)	4.05 m
2011	Universiade	Shenzhen, China	7th	4.25 m

== National titles ==
- Italian Athletics Championships: 2010
- Italian Athletics Indoor Championships: 2007, 2008, 2010

== See also ==
- Italian all-time lists - Pole vault
