= 2004 World Junior Championships in Athletics – Women's pole vault =

The women's pole vault event at the 2004 World Junior Championships in Athletics was held in Grosseto, Italy, at Stadio Olimpico Carlo Zecchini on 14 and 16 July.

== Medalists ==
Gold	Lisa Ryjikh; Germany
Silver	Zhao Yingying; China
Silver	Anna Schultze; Germany

== Results ==
=== Final ===
16 July

Rank	Name	Nationality	Result	Notes
1st place, gold medalist(s)	Lisa Ryjikh	Germany	4.30	
2nd place, silver medalist(s)	Zhao Yingying	China	4.25	
2nd place, silver medalist(s)	Anna Schultze	Germany	4.25	
4	Justyna Ratajczak	Poland	4.10	
5	Katarzyna Sowa	Poland	4.10	
6	Nikoléta Kiriakopoúlou	Greece	4.00	
7	Michaela Heitkoter	Brazil	3.90	
7	Camille Simon	France	3.90	
7	Elena Scarpellini	Italy	3.90	
10	Katrina Miroshnichenko	Australia	3.80	
	Jirina Ptácníková	Czech Republic	NH	
	Jennifer Green	United States	NH	

=== Qualifications ===
14 July

==== Group A ====
Rank	Name	Nationality	Result	Notes
1	Lisa Ryjikh	Germany	3.95	q
1	Elena Scarpellini	Italy	3.95	q
3	Justyna Ratajczak	Poland	3.95	q
4	Michaela Heitkoter	Brazil	3.85	q
4	Jirina Ptácníková	Czech Republic	3.85	q
6	Nikoléta Kiriakopoúlou	Greece	3.85	q
6	Jennifer Green	United States	3.85	q
8	Lotta Hultin	Sweden	3.85	
9	Adrianne Vangool	Canada	3.75	
10	Minna Nikkanen	Finland	3.75	
10	Marie Emilie Montagut	France	3.75	
12	Hannah Olson	United Kingdom	3.60	
	Milena Agudelo	Colombia	NH	
	Yayoi Minamino	Japan	NH	

==== Group B ====
Rank	Name	Nationality	Result	Notes
1	Zhao Yingying	China	3.95	q
1	Anna Schultze	Germany	3.95	q
3	Katarzyna Sowa	Poland	3.95	q
4	Katrina Miroshnichenko	Australia	3.95	q
5	Camille Simon	France	3.95	q
6	Fanny Berglund	Sweden	3.85	
7	Keisa Monterola	Venezuela	3.85	
8	Miina Kenttä	Finland	3.75	
9	Rita Obizajeva	Latvia	3.60	
9	Stevie Marshalek	United States	3.60	
11	Svetlana Makarevich	Belarus	3.60	
	Theresa Wiebe	Canada	NH	
	Gemma Piquer	Spain	NH	
	Aleksandra Kiryashova	Russia	NH	
	Mateja Drobnic	Slovenia	NH	

== Participation ==
According to an unofficial count, 29 athletes from 22 countries participated in the event.

- Australia (1)
- Belarus (1)
- Brazil (1)
- Canada (2)
- China (1)
- Colombia (1)
- Czech Republic (1)
- Finland (2)
- France (2)
- Germany (2)
- Greece (1)
- Italy (1)
- Japan (1)
- Latvia (1)
- Poland (2)
- Russia (1)
- Slovenia (1)
- Spain (1)
- Sweden (2)
- United Kingdom (1)
- United States (2)
- Venezuela (1)
