= Anna Katharina Schmid =

Swiss pole vaulter

Anna Katharina Schmid (born 12 December 1989) is a Swiss pole vaulter. She won the bronze medal at the 2007 European Junior Championships.

Her personal bests in the event are 4.45 metres outdoors (Basel 2011) and 4.42 metres indoors (Magglingen 2012).

== Achievements ==
Year	Competition	Venue	Position	Notes
Representing Switzerland
2007	European Junior Championships	Hengelo, Netherlands	3rd	4.25 m
2007	World Championships	Osaka, Japan	29th (q)	4.20 m
2010	European Championships	Barcelona, Spain	12th (q)	4.35 m
2011	European U23 Championships	Ostrava, Czech Republic	4th	4.30 m
2013	Jeux de la Francophonie	Nice, France	–	NM
2014	European Championships	Zürich, Switzerland	15th (q)	4.35 m
