= Malin Dahlström =

Swedish pole vaulter

Malin Dahlström (born 26 August 1989) is a Swedish athlete who specialises in the pole vault. She represented her country at the 2011 World Championships without qualifying for the final.

Her personal bests in the event are 4.50 metres outdoors (Rottach-Egern 2012) and 4.52 metres indoors (Dresden 2014).

== Competition record ==
Year	Competition	Venue	Position	Notes
Representing Sweden
2009	European U23 Championships	Kaunas, Lithuania	8th	4.15 m
2011	European Indoor Championships	Paris, France	14th (q)	4.35 m
2011	European U23 Championships	Ostrava, Czech Republic	5th	4.25 m
2011	World Championships	Daegu, South Korea	25th (q)	4.25 m
2012	European Championships	Helsinki, Finland	26th (q)	3.95 m
2013	European Indoor Championships	Gothenburg, Sweden	15th (q)	4.16 m
2015	European Indoor Championships	Prague, Czech Republic	13th (q)	4.45 m
2015	World Championships	Beijing, China	24th (q)	4.15 m
