= 2010 European Athletics Championships – Women's pole vault =

Women's pole vault at the European Athletics Championships

The women's pole vault at the 2010 European Athletics Championships was held at the Estadi Olímpic Lluís Companys on 28 and 30 July.

== Medalists ==
Gold	Svetlana Feofanova; Russia (RUS)
Silver	Silke Spiegelburg; Germany (GER)
Bronze	Lisa Ryzih; Germany (GER)

== Records ==
Standing records prior to the 2010 European Athletics Championships
World record	Yelena Isinbayeva (RUS)	5.06	Zürich, Switzerland	28 August 2009
European record	Yelena Isinbayeva (RUS)	5.06	Zürich, Switzerland	28 August 2009
Championship record	Yelena Isinbayeva (RUS)	4.80	Gothenburg, Sweden	12 August 2006
World Leading	Jennifer Suhr (USA)	4.89	Des Moines, United States	27 June 2010
European Leading	Carolin Hingst (GER)	4.72	Biberach, Germany	9 July 2010

== Schedule ==
Date	Time	Round
28 July 2010	10:30	Qualification
30 July 2010	18:30	Final

== Results ==
=== Qualification ===
Qualification: Qualification Performance 4.40 (Q) or at least 12 best performers advance to the final

Rank	Group	Athlete	Nationality	3.95	4.05	4.15	4.25	4.35	4.40	Result	Notes
1	A	Svetlana Feofanova	Russia	—	—	—	—	—	o	4.40	Q
1	B	Jiřina Ptáčníková	Czech Republic	—	—	—	o	—	o	4.40	Q
1	A	Silke Spiegelburg	Germany	—	—	—	—	—	o	4.40	Q
4	B	Yuliya Golubchikova	Russia	—	—	—	o	—	xo	4.40	Q
4	B	Carolin Hingst	Germany	—	—	—	—	—	xo	4.40	Q
6	B	Anastasiya Shvedova	Belarus	—	—	—	xo	o	xo	4.40	Q
7	A	Kate Dennison	Great Britain & N.I.	—	—	o	o	o	x	4.35	q
7	A	Tina Sutej	Slovenia	—	o	o	o	o	—	4.35	q
9	B	Minna Nikkanen	Finland	—	o	o	xo	o	x-	4.35	q
10	A	Lisa Ryzih	Germany	—	—	—	—	xo	x	4.35	q
11	A	Cathrine Larsåsen	Norway	—	xo	o	xxo	xo	x-	4.35	q, NR
12	B	Anna Katharina Schmid	Switzerland	—	xo	o	xxo	xxo	x-	4.35	q, =PB
13	B	Nikolía Kiriakopoúlou	Greece	—	—	o	o	xxx		4.25	
14	A	Naroa Agirre	Spain	—	xo	o	o	xxx		4.25	
15	A	Mariánna Zachariadi	Cyprus	—	xo	o	xo	xxx		4.25	
16	A	Romana Maláčová	Czech Republic	—	o	o	xxo	xxx		4.25	
17	B	Afrodíti Skafída	Greece	xo	xxo	xxo	xxo	xxx		4.25	
18	B	Anna María Pinero	Spain	—	o	o	xxx			4.15	
18	B	Hanna-Mia Persson	Sweden	—	o	o	xxx			4.15	
20	B	Caroline Bonde Holm	Denmark	—	o	xo	xxx			4.15	=SB
21	A	Tori Pena	Ireland	o	xo	xo	xxx			4.15	=NR
22	A	Elena Scarpellini	Italy	—	o	—	xxx			4.05	
23	B	Maria Eleonor Tavares	Portugal	o	xo	xxx				4.05	
24	A	Sandra-Hélèna Homo	Portugal	o	—	xxx				3.95	
25	B	Denise Groot	Netherlands	—	xxx					NM	

=== Final ===
Rank	Athlete	Nationality	4.15	4.25	4.35	4.45	4.55	4.65	4.70	4.75	Result	Notes
1st place, gold medalist(s)	Svetlana Feofanova	Russia	—	—	—	o	—	o	xo	o	4.75	EL
2nd place, silver medalist(s)	Silke Spiegelburg	Germany	—	—	—	o	o	o	xx-	x	4.65	
3rd place, bronze medalist(s)	Lisa Ryzih	Germany	—	—	xo	—	xxo	o	xx-	x	4.65	PB
4	Anastasiya Shvedova	Belarus	—	o	xo	xo	o	xo	xxx		4.65	NR
5	Jiřina Ptáčníková	Czech Republic	—	o	—	o	o	xxo	xxx		4.65	
6	Kate Dennison	Great Britain & N.I.	—	o	o	o	xo	xxx			4.55	=SB
7	Yuliya Golubchikova	Russia	—	o	—	xo	xo	xxx			4.55	
8	Cathrine Larsåsen	Norway	o	xo	o	xxx					4.35	NR
9	Minna Nikkanen	Finland	o	xo	xo	xxx					4.35	
10	Tina Sutej	Slovenia	xxo	xo	xo	xxx					4.35	
11	Carolin Hingst	Germany	—	—	xxo	xxx					4.35	
	Anna Katharina Schmid	Switzerland	xxx								NM	
