= Katerina Stefanidi =

Greek pole vaulter (born 1990)

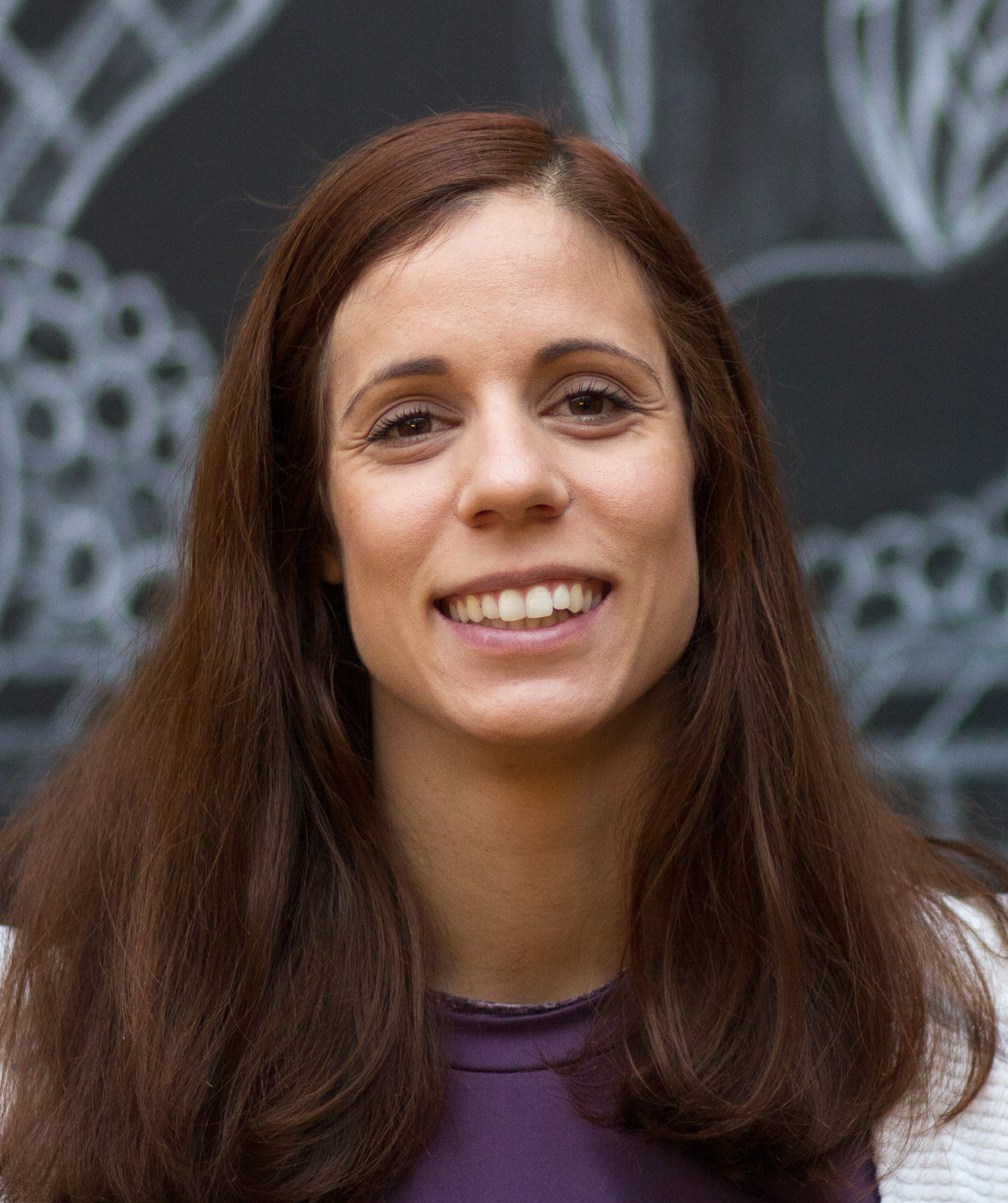
- Stefanidi in 2019

Personal information
- Born: 4 February 1990 (age 36) Cholargos, Athens, Greece
- Height: 1.73 m (5 ft 8 in)
- Weight: 59 kg (130 lb)

Sport
- Country: Greece
- Sport: Athletics
- Event: Pole vault
- University team: Stanford University
- Coached by: Mitchell Krier

Achievements and titles
- Personal bests: 4.91 m NR (London 2017); Indoors; 4.90 m(i) NR (New York 2016)
Medal record
Athletics
Representing Greece
Event	1st	2nd	3rd
Olympic Games	1	0	0
World Championships	1	0	1
World Indoor Championships	0	0	2
Diamond League	4	0	0
European Championships	2	3	0
European Indoor Championships	1	1	0
European Team Championships	2	0	0
Continental Cup	0	1	0
Total	11	5	3
Olympic Games
Gold medal – first place	2016 Rio de Janeiro	Pole vault
World Championships
Gold medal – first place	2017 London	Pole vault
Bronze medal – third place	2019 Doha	Pole vault
World Indoor Championships
Bronze medal – third place	2016 Portland	Pole vault
Bronze medal – third place	2018 Birmingham	Pole vault
Diamond League
First place	2016	Pole vault
First place	2017	Pole vault
First place	2018	Pole vault
First place	2019	Pole vault
European Championships
Gold medal – first place	2016 Amsterdam	Pole vault
Gold medal – first place	2018 Berlin	Pole vault
Silver medal – second place	2014 Zurich	Pole vault
Silver medal – second place	2022 Munich	Pole vault
Silver medal – second place	2024 Rome	Pole vault
European Indoor Championships
Gold medal – first place	2017 Belgrade	Pole vault
Silver medal – second place	2015 Prague	Pole vault
European Team Championships
Gold medal – first place	2017 Villeneuve-d'Ascq	Pole vault
Gold medal – first place	2019 Bydgoszcz	Pole vault
Continental Cup
Representing Europe
Silver medal – second place	2018 Ostrava	Pole vault
Summer Universiade
Bronze medal – third place	2011 Shenzhen	Pole vault
European U23 Championships
Silver medal – second place	2011 Ostrava	Pole vault
World Junior Championships
Bronze medal – third place	2008 Bydgoszcz	Pole vault
World Youth Championships
Gold medal – first place	2005 Marrakesh	Pole vault
Silver medal – second place	2007 Ostrava	Pole vault

Katerina Stefanidi (Greek: Κατερίνα Στεφανίδη; born 4 February 1990) is a Greek pole vaulter. She won the gold medal at the 2016 Rio Olympics and has also competed at the 2012 London and the 2020 Tokyo Olympics. Stefanidi was the 2017 World champion and earned bronze at the 2019 World Championships. At the European Athletics Championships, she has won two gold medals (2016, 2018) and three silvers (2014, 2022, 2024). Indoors, she is a two-time World Indoor bronze medallist from 2016 and 2018, was the 2017 European Indoor champion and earned silver at the 2015 European Indoor Championships.

At age 15, Stefanidi became the 2005 World Under-18 champion and earned silver at the 2007 edition of this championships. The 18-year-old won bronze at the 2008 World U20 Championships. She then placed second at the 2011 European U23 Championships and third at the 2011 Universiade. She won four Diamond League Trophies between 2016 and 2019. Stefanidi was voted the European Women's Athlete of the Year in 2017 and the Greek Female Athlete of the Year in 2017 and 2019. Because of her achievements she is widely regarded as the greatest female athlete in the history of Greek sport.

== Personal life ==
Katerina Stefanidi was born to athletes Georgios Stefanidis and Zoi Vareli, who competed internationally in the triple jump and sprints, respectively. Her younger sister, Georgia, is also a pole vaulter. In 2015, she married Mitchell Krier, her future coach and also a former pole vaulter. She lives in the United States.

== Career ==
=== Junior level: 2005–2010 ===
Stefanidi attended the 1st High School of Pallini where she won the National High School Championships. She broke the national high school pole vault record and the championship record, winning gold at the 2006 Gymnasiade. Growing up she broke all of the world age-group records for the ages of 11–14 and right after she turned 15, she broke the world under-18 best with a jump of 4.37 m. Her first international experience came at the age of 15, when she represented Greece at the 2005 World Youth Championships in Marrakesh, winning the gold medal and setting a championship record of 4.30 m in the process. At the 2007 edition held in Ostrava, she was second with 4.25 m. In 2008, the 18-year-old won the bronze medal with 4.25 m at the World Junior Championships in Bydgoszcz, Poland. The same year, she gained an athletic scholarship at Stanford University and began competing for the Stanford Cardinal track and field team. She received her master's degree in cognitive psychology with Dr. Gene A. Brewer at Arizona State University while training under the guidance of 2000 Olympic pole vault champion Nick Hysong.

At Stanford, Stefanidi broke the freshman school record with a leap of 4.13 m, under the guidance of coach Kris Mack and head coach Edrick Floreal. In 2010, under the guidance of Toby Stevenson, she tied for fifth place (4.30 m) at the NCAA Division I Indoor Championships, was the Pac-10 Conference champion and tied for fourth (4.25 m) at the NCAA Division I Outdoor Championships, after breaking the school record multiple times.

=== 2011–2013 ===
In 2011, she was second at the NCAA Indoors with 4.40 m. That same year she defended her Pac-10 Conference title (4.28 m) and was third at the NCAA Outdoors with 4.40 m. She placed second at the European Under-23 Championships in Ostrava, Czechia and third at Universiade in Shenzhen, China, after jumping a personal best of 4.45 m in both competitions to tie the Greek U23 record.

Her senior year, Stefanidi placed third at the NCAA Indoors (4.35 m). In the 2012 outdoor season, she was again the Pac-12 Conference champion in Eugene, Oregon, where she broke her own school record with 4.48 m. A month later she became the NCAA champion in Des Moines, Iowa, clearing 4.45 m. Her season's best, 4.51 m, achieved in July in Livermore, California, is the Greek under-23 record.

In 2013, she faced some injury problems, thus not improving her personal best, with a 4.45 m season's best.

=== 2014–2015 ===
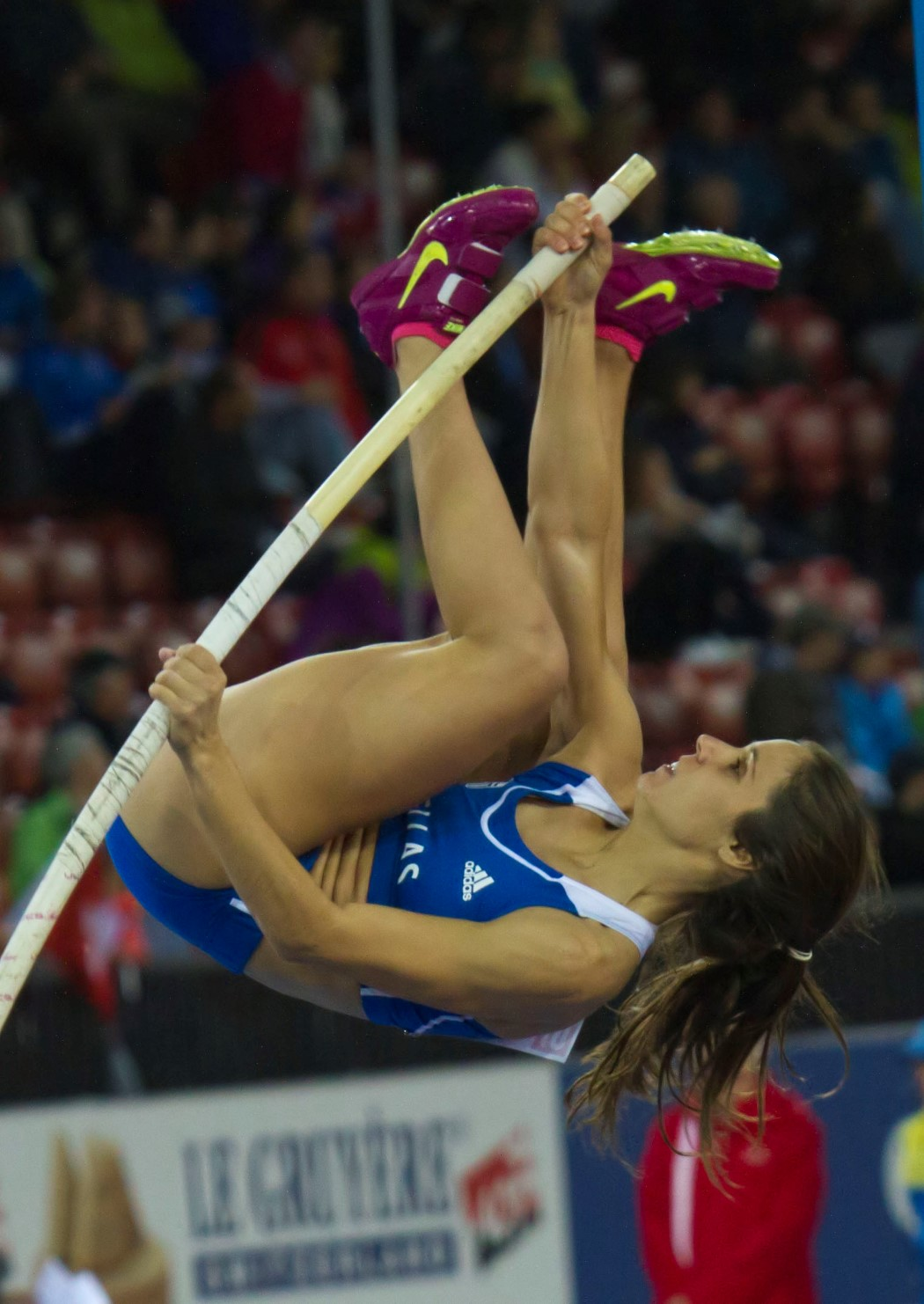
Stefanidi at the 2014 European Championships in Zurich

In the 2014 indoor season, she improved her personal best to 4.55 m. In the 2014 outdoor season, she improved her lifetime best to 4.57 m and then established even better best of 4.60 m at the Diamond League meeting in New York City. She competed for the first time at the European Athletics Team Championships 1st league, held in Tallinn, representing Greece and winning with a 4.55 m jump. She managed to improve her PB again at the Glasgow Diamond League in with a jump at 4.65 m. One week before the European Championships she set another personal best at 4.71 m, equaling the Greek national record.

At the 2014 European Championships held in Zurich, Switzerland she had an easy qualification, while in the final she had her first success in major events by winning the silver medal with 4.60 m, losing the gold medal in the very last jump of the event to Anzhelika Sidorova. She later won the Birmingham Diamond League meeting with 4.57 m and took the third place at the circuit's final held in Zürich with 4.67 m. With these results, she took the second place overall at the Diamond League series, only behind Fabiana Murer. During 2014, she jumped 10 times above 4.55 m, while her pre-2014 PB was 4.51 m.

During the 2015 indoor season, she set a personal best four times (4.56 m, 4.60 m, 4.61 m and 4.77 m, which was temporarily the national record). At the 2015 European Indoor Championships, she won the silver medal with 4.75 m.

=== 2016 ===
During training season and outside of competitions, Stefanidi trained at SPIRE Institute and Academy, a United States Olympic Training Center in Geneva, Ohio.

In the 2016 indoor season, she set a national record with a huge leap of 4.90 m at the Millrose Games, which ranked her at fourth place of all time in the event, tied with Demi Payne who cleared the same height at the same meeting. At the World Indoor Championships in Portland, Oregon, Stefanidi won the bronze medal with a jump of 4.80 m. In the following months she continuously improved her personal outdoor record (4.73, 4.75 and 4.77 m), and in Filothei, she set a Greek record of 4.86 m. In July at the Amsterdam European Championships, she won the gold medal with 4.81 m, taking the competition record from Yelena Isinbayeva.

At the 2016 Rio Olympics, Stefanidi became Olympic champion with a jump of 4.85 m, becoming the seventh Greek female athlete to win a gold medal at the Summer Olympic Games. In September, she won her first Diamond League Trophy.

=== 2017–2018 ===
During the 2017 indoor season, she became the European Indoor champion with a world-leading jump of 4.85 m. In the 2017 summer season, she set a world lead at the Rome Diamond League with 4.85 m and attempted for the first time to set a new world record. Two years after a disappointing performance at the 2015 Beijing World Championship, where she missed the final, Stefanidi won the gold medal at the World Championships held in London, where she even broke her own Greek record and set a new world lead for 2017 by vaulting 4.91 m. Katerina completed her 2017 outdoor season undefeated (14 wins in a row) and winning the Diamond League final in Brussels. On 14 October that year, at the traditional European Athletics gala in Vilnius, Lithuania, she was named European Women's Athlete of the Year.

In 2018, Stefanidi increased her collection of medals, taking the third place (4.80 m) at the World Indoor Championships in Birmingham, and the first place (4.85 m) at the Berlin European Championships. She won the Diamond League title for a third consecutive year and completed the season with a second place (4.85 m) behind Anzhelika Sidorova, representing Europe at the Continental Cup.

=== 2019–2024 ===
In 2019, she won the Diamond League Trophy for a record fourth consecutive year and won the bronze medal at the 2019 World Championships in Doha, Qatar.

In 2020, as the COVID-19 pandemic shut down most public sports events, Stefanidi, along with Katie Nageotte and Alysha Newman, took part in an online event conceived by Renaud Lavillenie and organized by World Athletics called "The Ultimate Garden Clash". At their local tracks, athletes had to collect as many vault clearances in two 15-minute periods as possible with the bar set at four metres. Stefanidi won with 34 clearances. She was training at SPIRE Institute and Academy to prepare for the 2020 Tokyo Olympics. At the Games, she took the fourth place, equaling her season's best with a jump of 4.80 m.

In 2022 Stefanidi won the silver medal at the European Championships in Munich, behind Wilma Murto, with a season's best (4.75m). In 2024 she won another silver medal at the European Championships in Rome (4.73m), behind Angelica Moser. At the 2024 Olympic Games' final in Paris she took the 9th place (4.70m).

=== 2026–present ===
After a period away from competition and following the birth of her son (2025), Stefanidi returned in February 2026. In June 2026 she won the Balkan Athletics Championships in Volos, Greece.

== Achievements ==
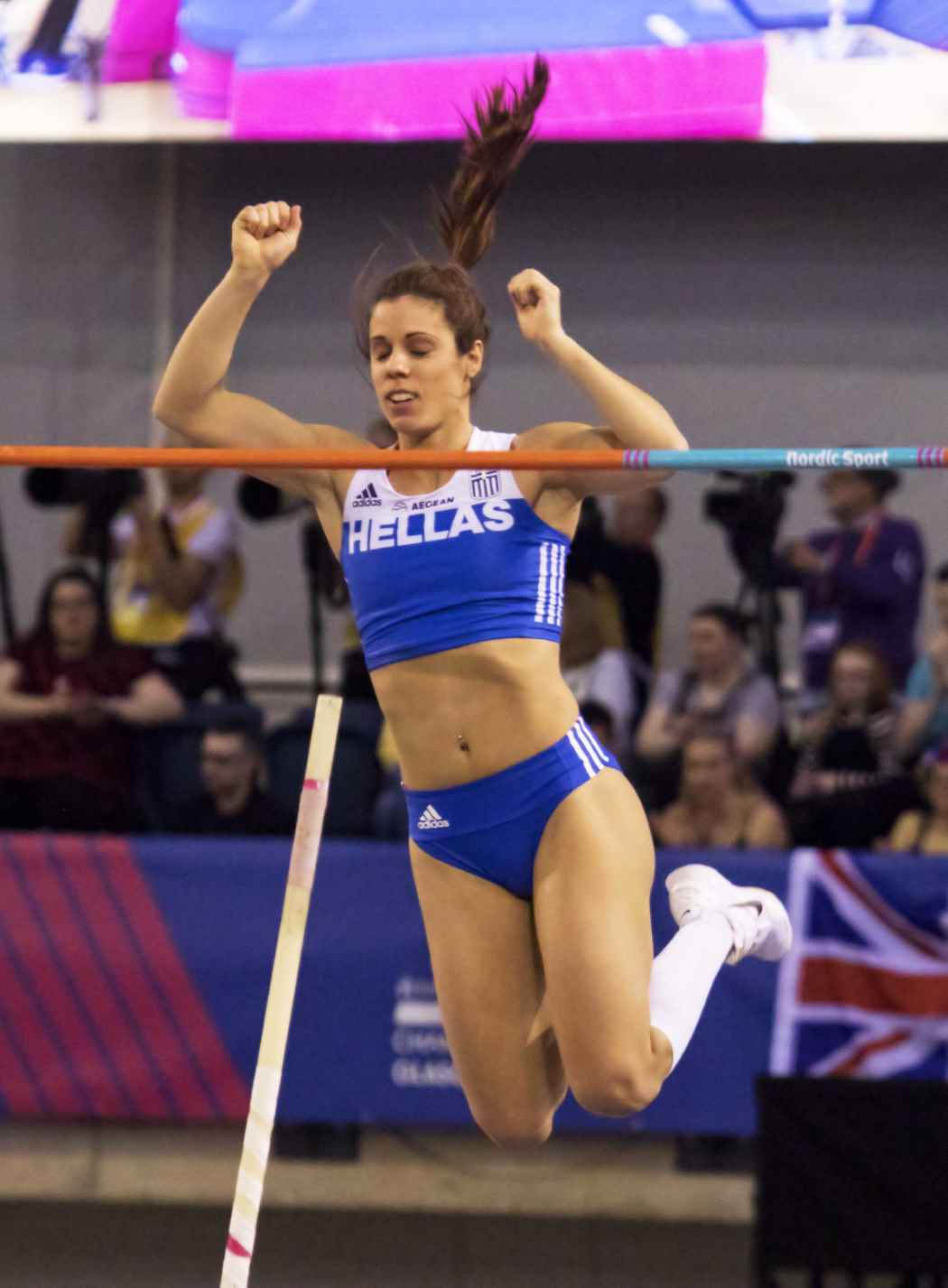
Glasgow 2019

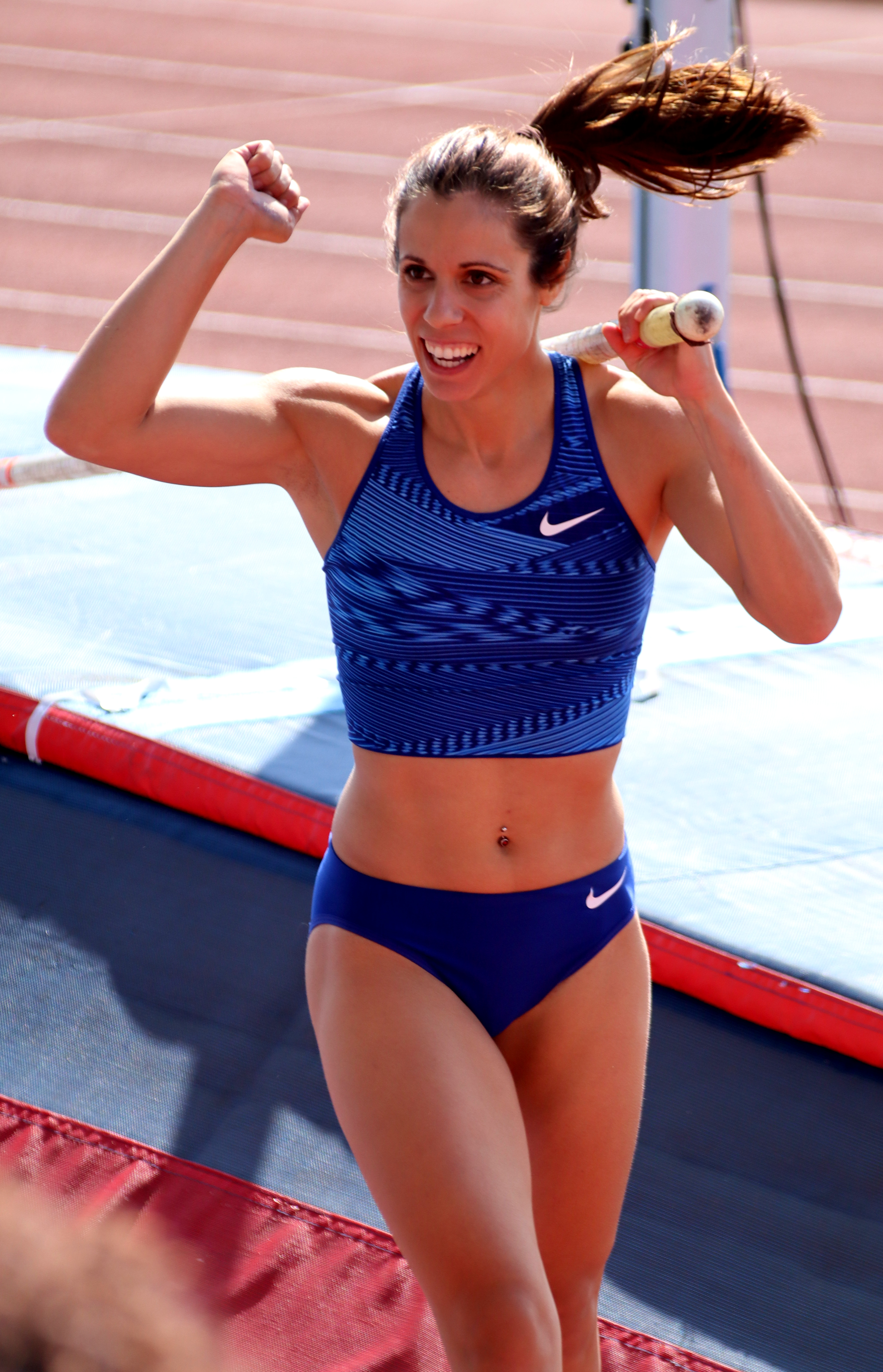
2019 Birmingham Grand Prix

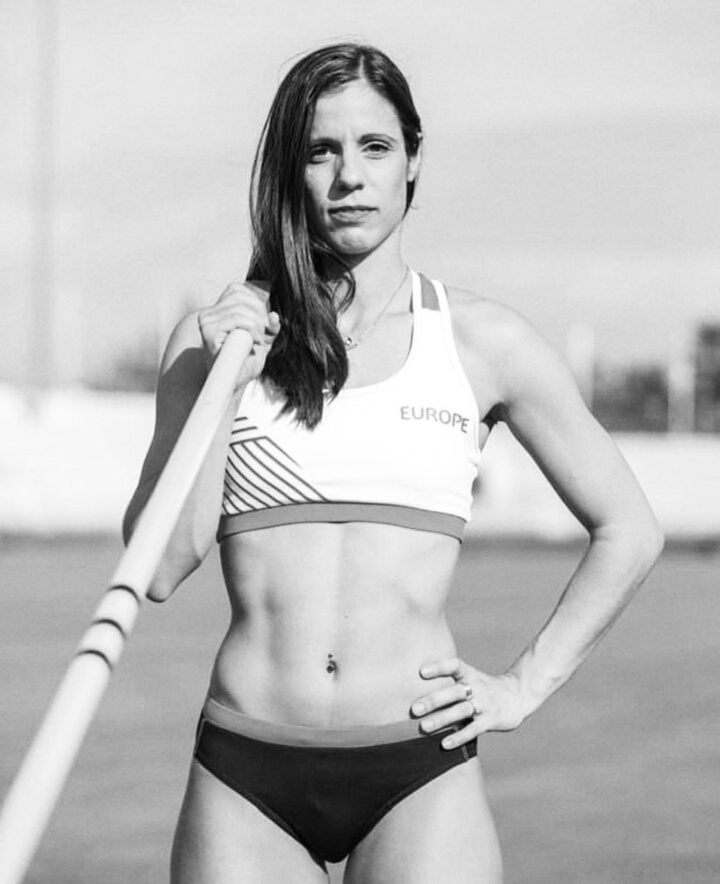
Katerina Stefanidi in 2020

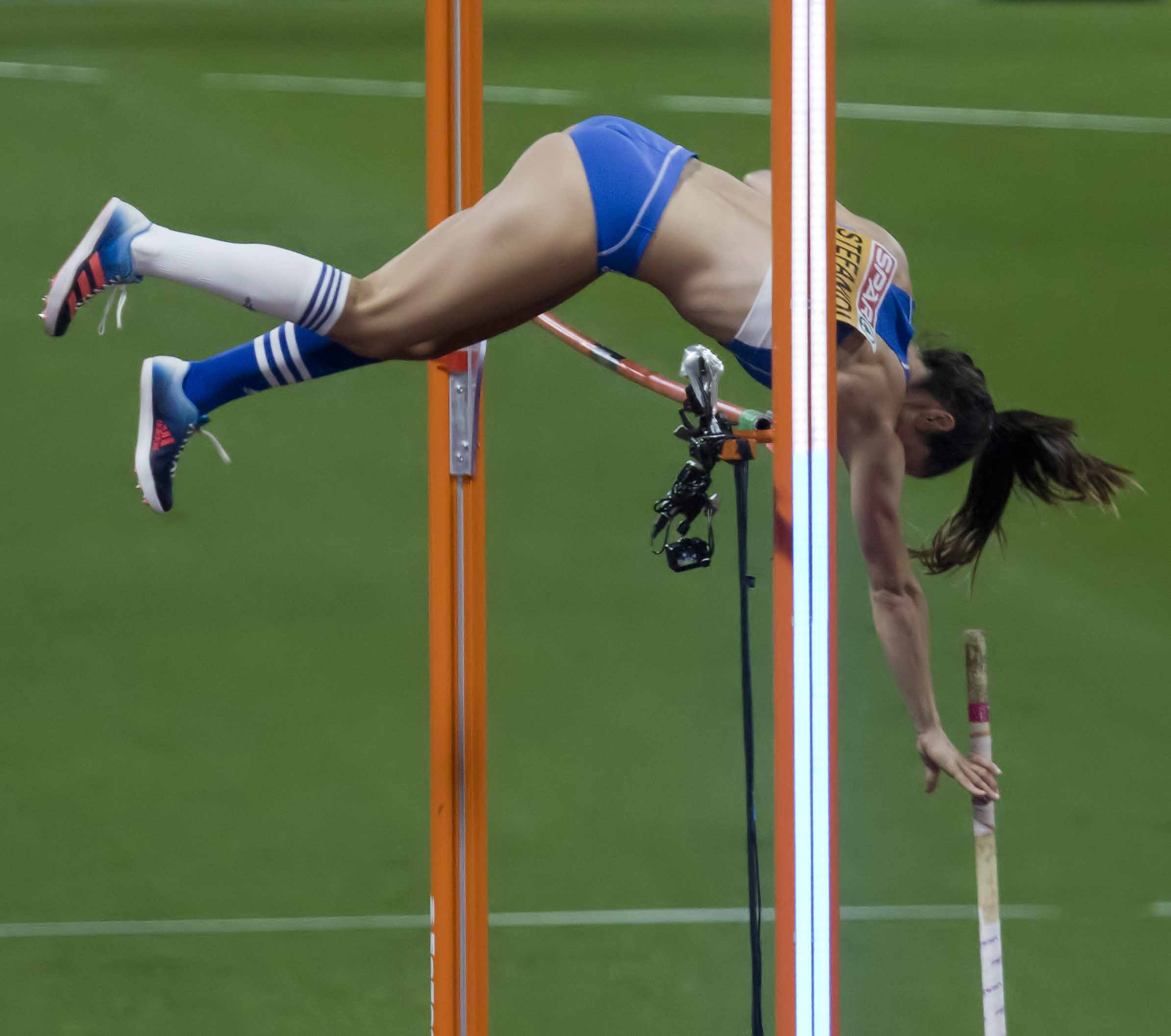
Munich 2022

=== International competitions ===
Representing Greece
Year	Competition	Venue	Position	Result
2005	World Youth Championships	Marrakesh, Morocco	1st	4.30 m CR
2007	World Youth Championships	Ostrava, Czech Republic	2nd	4.25 m SB
2008	World Junior Championships	Bydgoszcz, Poland	3rd	4.25 m SB
2011	European U23 Championships	Ostrava, Czech Republic	2nd	4.45 m NU23R
2011	Universiade	Shenzhen, China	3rd	4.45 m
2012	European Championships	Helsinki, Finland	– (f)	NM
2012	Olympic Games	London, United Kingdom	24th (q)	4.25 m
2013	European Indoor Championships	Gothenburg, Sweden	13th (q)	4.36 m
2014	European Championships	Zurich, Switzerland	2nd	4.60 m
2015	European Indoor Championships	Prague, Czech Republic	2nd	4.75 m
2015	World Championships	Beijing, China	15th (q)	4.45 m
2016	World Indoor Championships	Portland, United States	3rd	4.80 m
2016	European Championships	Amsterdam, Netherlands	1st	4.81 m CR
2016	Olympic Games	Rio de Janeiro, Brazil	1st	4.85 m
2017	European Indoor Championships	Belgrade, Serbia	1st	4.85 m WL
2017	European Team Championships Super League	Villeneuve-d'Ascq, France	1st	4.70
2017	World Championships	London, United Kingdom	1st	4.91 m WL NR
2018	World Indoor Championships	Birmingham, United Kingdom	3rd	4.80 m
2018	European Championships	Berlin, Germany	1st	4.85 m CR
2018	Continental Cup	Ostrava, Czech Republic	2nd	4.85 m CR
2019	European Indoor Championships	Glasgow, United Kingdom	4th	4.65 m
2019	European Team Championships Super League	Bydgoszcz, Poland	1st	4.70 m
2019	World Championships	Doha, Qatar	3rd	4.85 m SB
2021	Olympic Games	Tokyo, Japan	4th	4.80 m =SB
2022	World Championships	Eugene, United States	5th	4.70 m SB
2022	European Championships	Munich, Germany	2nd	4.75 m SB
2023	European Indoor Championships	Istanbul, Turkey	4th	4.60 m
2023	European Team Championships 1st Division	Chorzów, Poland	8th	4.40 m
2023	World Championships	Budapest, Hungary	–	NM
2024	World Indoor Championships	Glasgow, United Kingdom	7th	4.55 m
2024	European Championships	Rome, Italy	2nd	4.73 m SB
2024	Olympic Games	Paris, France	9th	4.70 m
2026	Balkan Championships	Volos, Greece	1st	4.48 m CR
2026	European Championships	Birmingham, United Kingdom	6th	4.60 m SB

=== Circuit wins and titles ===
- Diamond League pole vault Overall winner (4): 2016, 2017, 2018, 2019
  - 2014 (1): Birmingham British Grand Prix
  - 2016 (4): Rabat Meeting International (MR), Rome Golden Gala (=PB), Monaco Herculis, London Anniversary Games
  - 2017 (6): Doha Diamond League (EL), Rome (WL), London, Birmingham, Zürich Weltklasse (DLR), Brussels Memorial Van Damme
  - 2018 (2): Lausanne Athletissima (SB), Zürich
  - 2019 (3): Shanghai Diamond League (SB), Birmingham, Brussels

=== Progression ===
Performance	Venue	Date	Notes
4.91 m	London, United Kingdom	2017, 6 August	NR
4.86 m	Filothei (Athens), Greece	2016, 8 June	NR
4.77 m	Birmingham, United Kingdom	2016, 5 June	
4.75 m	Rabat, Morocco	2016, 22 May	
4.90 m i	New York (Armory), United States	2016, 20 February	NRi
4.80 m i	New York (Armory), United States	2016, 20 February	
4.77 m i	Flagstaff, United States	2015, 20 February	NR
4.71 m	Monaco, Monaco	2014, 18 July	=NR
4.65 m	Glasgow, United Kingdom	2014, 12 July	
4.60 m	New York City, United States	2014, 15 June	
4.57 m	Chula Vista, United States	2014, 30 May	
4.55 m i	Flagstaff, United States	2014, 25 January	
4.51 m	Livermore, United States	2012, 16 June	NU23R
4.48 m	Eugene, United States	2012, 13 May	NU23R
4.45 m	Ostrava, Czech Republic	2011, 17 July	=NU23R
4.41 m i	Seattle, United States	2011, 15 January	
4.30 m	Marrakesh, Morocco	2005, 16 July	
4.37 m i	Peania, Greece	2005, 20 February	previous WU18B
4.14 m	Korinthos, Greece	2004, 3 July	
3.95 m i	Peania, Greece	2004, 17 January	
3.90 m	Chania, Greece	2003, 9 June	
3.60 m i	Athens, Greece	2003, 22 February	
3.40 m	Athens, Greece	2002, 9 June	
