= Anastasiya Shvedova =

Belarusian-Russian pole vaulter (born 1979)

Personal information
- Born: 3 May 1979 (age 47) Saint Petersburg
- Height: 1.74 m (5 ft 8 1/2 in)
- Weight: 62 kg (137 lb)

Sport
- Country: Belarus
- Sport: Athletics
- Event: Pole Vault
- Updated on 6 August 2012

Anastasiya Shvedova (Belarusian: Настасься Шведава; née Ivanova; born 3 May 1979) is a Belarusian, formerly Russian, pole vaulter.

== International competitions ==
Year	Competition	Venue	Position	Result	Notes
Representing Russia
2003	Universiade	Daegu, South Korea	2nd	4.40 m	
2004	Olympic Games	Athens, Greece	18th (q)	4.30 m	
Representing Belarus
2010	European Championships	Barcelona, Spain	4th	4.65 m	
2011	European Indoor Championships	Paris, France	8th	4.50 m	
2011	World Championships	Daegu, South Korea	18th (q)	4.40 m	
2012	European Championships	Helsinki, Finland	9th	4.40 m	
2012	Olympic Games	London, United Kingdom	17th (q)	4.40 m	

== See also ==
- List of pole vault national champions (women)
