= Romana Maláčová =

Czech pole vaulter

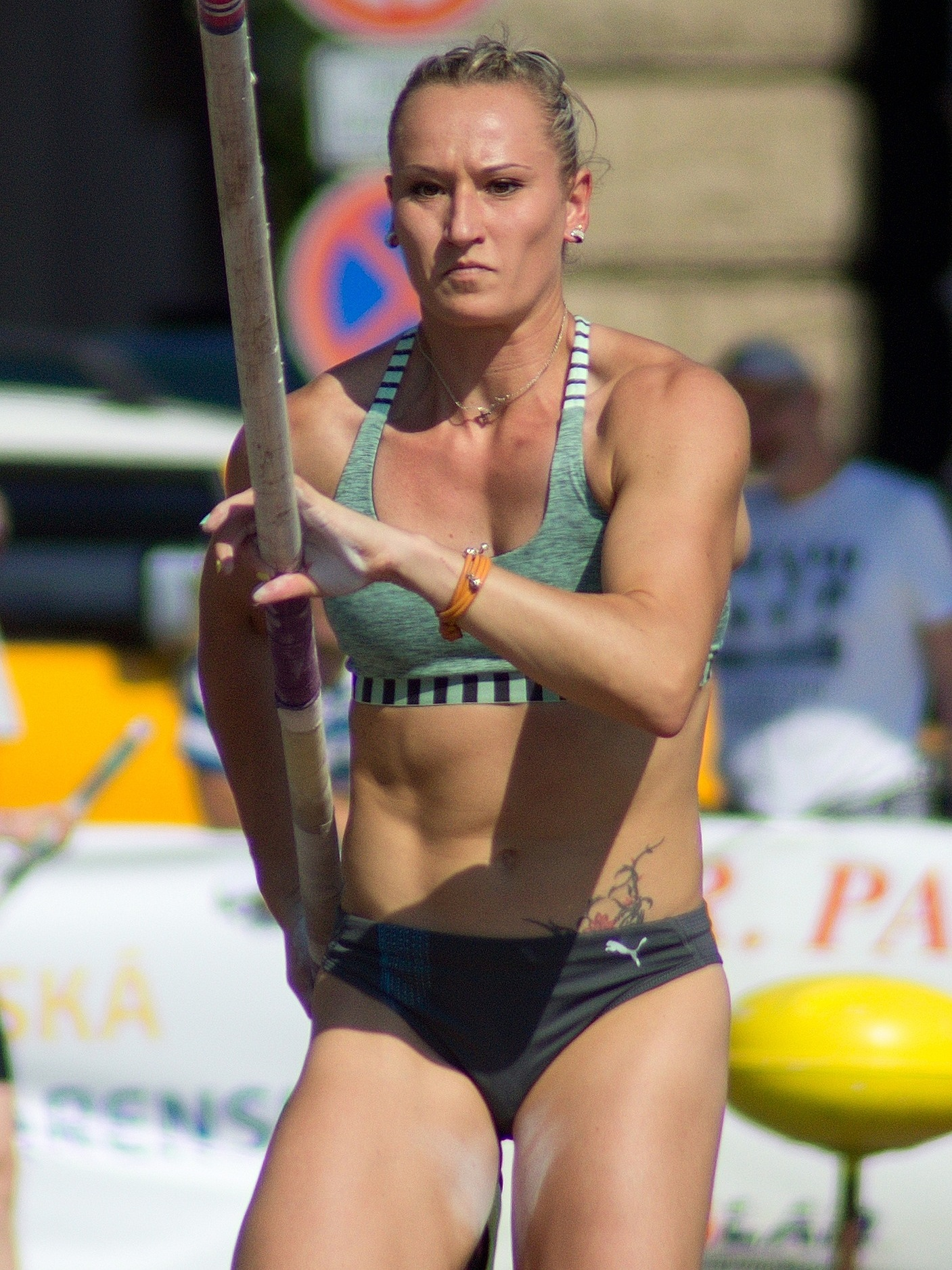

Personal information
- Born: 15 May 1987 (age 39) Brno, Czechoslovakia
- Education: University of Economics and Management
- Height: 1.64 m (5 ft 5 in)
- Weight: 56 kg (123 lb)

Sport
- Sport: Athletics
- Event: Pole vault
- Club: USK Praha; KS AZS AWF Wrocław Playas de Castellón (ESP)
- Coached by: Zdeněk Lubenský; Dariusz Łoś

Romana Maláčová (Czech pronunciation: [ˈromana ˈmalaːtʃovaː]; born 15 May 1987, in Brno) is a Czech athlete who specialises in the pole vault. She represented her country at the 2009 World Championships without qualifying for the final. In addition, she competed at three outdoor and two indoor European Championships.

Her personal bests in the event are 4.50 metres outdoors (Prague 2014) and 4.62 metres indoors (Clermont-Ferrand 2016).

== Competition record ==
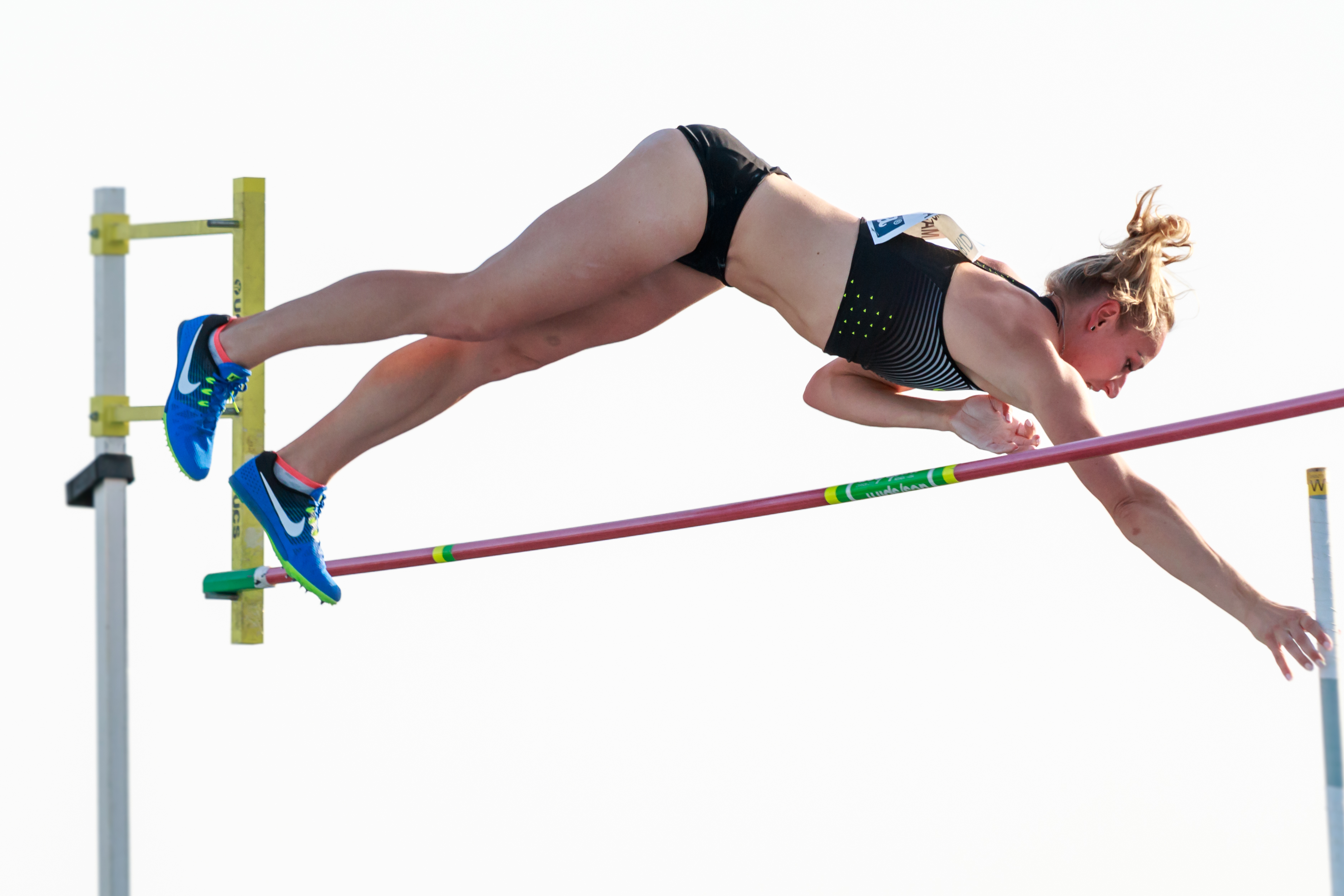
Romana Maláčová jumping during the IAAF World Challenge Meeting Madrid 2017.

Year	Competition	Venue	Position	Notes
Representing the Czech Republic
2006	World Junior Championships	Beijing, China	17th (q)	3.80 m
2007	European U23 Championships	Debrecen, Hungary	12th	4.00 m
2009	European U23 Championships	Kaunas, Lithuania	11th	4.05 m
2009	World Championships	Berlin, Germany	30th (q)	4.10 m
2010	European Championships	Barcelona, Spain	16th (q)	4.25 m
2011	Universiade	Shenzhen, China	10th	4.25 m
2012	European Championships	Helsinki, Finland	18th (q)	4.25 m
2013	European Indoor Championships	Gothenburg, Sweden	10th (q)	4.36 m
2013	Universiade	Kazan, Russia	4th	4.30 m
2014	European Championships	Zürich, Switzerland	17th (q)	4.25 m
2015	European Indoor Championships	Prague, Czech Republic	16th (q)	4.30 m
2015	Universiade	Gwangju, South Korea	6th	4.25 m
2016	World Indoor Championships	Portland, United States	8th	4.50 m
2016	European Championships	Amsterdam, Netherlands	–	NM
2016	Olympic Games	Rio de Janeiro, Brazil	24th (q)	4.30 m
2017	European Indoor Championships	Belgrade, Serbia	13th	4.40 m
2017	World Championships	London, United Kingdom	18th (q)	4.35 m
2019	European Indoor Championships	Glasgow, United Kingdom	13th (q)	4.50 m
2019	World Championships	Doha, Qatar	22nd (q)	4.35 m
2021	Olympic Games	Tokyo, Japan	23rd (q)	4.40 m
