= 2011 European Athletics Indoor Championships – Women's pole vault =

The Women's pole vault event at the 2011 European Athletics Indoor Championships was held on March 5–6, 2011 with the final on March 6 at 15:00.

== Records ==
Standing records prior to the 2011 European Athletics Indoor Championships
World record	Yelena Isinbayeva (RUS)	5.00	Donetsk, Ukraine	15 February 2009
European record	Yelena Isinbayeva (RUS)	5.00	Donetsk, Ukraine	15 February 2009
Championship record	Yelena Isinbayeva (RUS)	4.90	Madrid, Spain	6 March 2005
World Leading	Jennifer Suhr (USA)	4.86 A	Albuquerque, United States	27 February 2011
Europe Leading	Yelena Isinbayeva (RUS)	4.85	Donetsk, Ukraine	17 February 2011

== Results ==
=== Qualification ===
Qualification: Qualification Performance 4.55 (Q) or at least 8 best performers advanced to the final.

Rank	Athlete	Nationality	3.90	4.15	4.35	4.45	4.50	4.55	Result	Notes
1	Anna Rogowska	Poland	–	–	–	o	–	o	4.55	Q
1	Elizaveta Ryzih	Germany	–	–	o	o	–	o	4.55	Q
1	Silke Spiegelburg	Germany	–	–	o	o	–	o	4.55	Q
4	Minna Nikkanen	Finland	–	o	xxo	o	xxo	o	4.55	Q, NR
5	Anastasiya Shvedova	Belarus	–	o	o	o	o	xo	4.55	Q, NR
6	Nikolía Kiriakopoúlou	Greece	–	o	o	o	xo	xo	4.55	Q, =NR
6	Aleksandra Kiryashova	Russia	–	o	o	o	xo	xo	4.55	Q
8	Kristina Gadschiew	Germany	–	–	o	xo	o	xxo	4.55	Q
9	Jiřina Ptáčníková	Czech Republic	–	–	xxo	o	o	xxo	4.55	Q
10	Anna Giordano Bruno	Italy	o	o	xxo	xo	xxx		4.45	SB
11	Holly Bleasdale	Great Britain	–	o	o	xxo	xxx		4.45	
12	Angelica Bengtsson	Sweden	o	xo	o	xxx			4.35	
12	Victoria Pena	Ireland	o	xo	o	xxx			4.35	NR
14	Malin Dahlström	Sweden	–	o	xxo	xxx			4.35	
15	Naroa Agirre	Spain	o	o	xxx				4.15	
15	Caroline Bonde Holm	Denmark	–	o	xxx				4.15	
17	Cathrine Larsåsen	Norway	–	xo	xxx				4.15	
18	Maria Eleonor Tavares	Portugal	o	xxo	xxx				4.15	
19	Iben Høgh-Pedersen	Denmark	o	xxx					3.90	
20	Giorgia Benecchi	Italy	xo	xxx					3.90	

=== Final ===
Rank	Athlete	Nationality	4.20	4.35	4.50	4.60	4.65	4.70	4.75	4.80	4.85	4.91	Result	Notes
1st place, gold medalist(s)	Anna Rogowska	Poland	–	o	–	xo	–	o	xo	o	xo	xxx	4.85	NR, =EL
2nd place, silver medalist(s)	Silke Spiegelburg	Germany	–	–	o	–	xo	o	xo	x–	xx		4.75	
3rd place, bronze medalist(s)	Kristina Gadschiew	Germany	–	o	o	o	o	x–	xx				4.65	
4	Jiřina Ptáčníková	Czech Republic	–	o	o	o	xx–	x					4.60	=PB
4	Minna Nikkanen	Finland	o	o	o	o	xxx						4.60	NR
6	Aleksandra Kiryashova	Russia	o	xo	o	o	xxx						4.60	
7	Elizaveta Ryzih	Germany	–	–	xxo	x–	xx						4.50	
8	Anastasiya Shvedova	Belarus	o	o	xxo	xxx							4.50	
9	Nikolía Kiriakopoúlou	Greece	xo	o	xxx								4.35	
