= Lisa Ryzih =

German pole vaulter (born 1988)

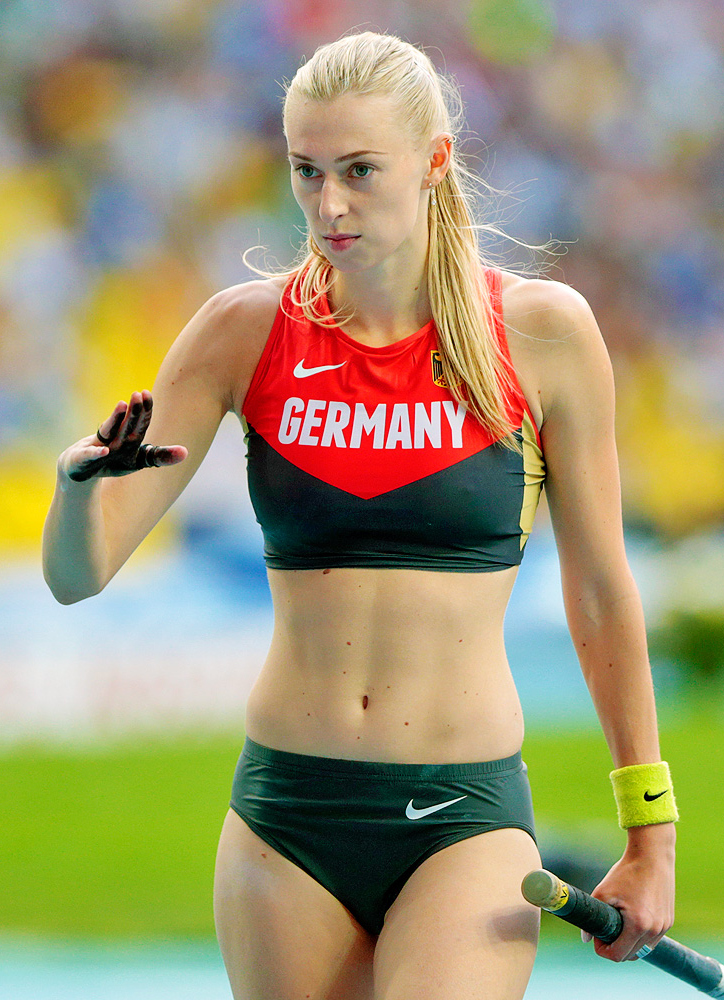
- Ryzih at the 2013 World Championships in Athletics

Personal information
- Full name: Elizaveta Ryzih
- Born: 27 September 1988 (age 37) Omsk, Soviet Union
- Height: 1.79 m (5 ft 10 in)
- Weight: 60 kg (132 lb)

Sport
- Country: Germany
- Sport: Athletics
- Event: Pole vault

Achievements and titles
- Personal bests: Pole vault: 4.75 m indoor, 4.73 m outdoor
Medal record
European Championships
Silver medal – second place	2016 Amsterdam	Pole vault
Bronze medal – third place	2010 Barcelona	Pole vault
European Indoor Championships
Silver medal – second place	2017 Belgrade	Pole vault
Continental Cup
Silver medal – second place	2010 Split	Pole vault

Elizaveta Ryzih (born 27 September 1988 in Omsk, Soviet Union) is a German pole vault athlete. Two times an Olympian, she placed 6th in the London and 10th in Rio Olympic Games. She was described by one athletics commentator as a "tall, fast and athletic" pole vaulter. She saw success in European Championships, as well as being a constant presence in the world yearly rankings of pole vaulters, placing among the top 10 vaulters in recent years. She is the younger sister of fellow pole vaulter Anastasija Reiberger (Nastja Ryjikh). She is coached by her father Vladimir Ryzih.

== Biography ==
=== Junior career ===
Ryzih won at the 2003 World Youth Championships in Athletics and then set a personal best of 4.30 m for gold at the 2004 World Junior Championships in Athletics at the age of 15. She attempted to be the first athlete to win consecutive titles at the 2005 World Youth Championships in Marrakesh, Morocco, but she managed only 4.05 m for fifth place. Ryzih was the favourite to retain her title at the 2006 World Junior Championships in Athletics, but failed to clear the opening height in the final after three attempts.

Ryzih came fourth at the 2007 European Athletics Junior Championships and also won gold at the 2009 European Under-23 Athletics Championships in the women's pole vault in Kaunas, Lithuania. On 30 July 2010, she recorded a personal best of 4.65 m at the 2010 European Athletics Championships in Barcelona, Spain. This gained her the bronze medal, the first international medal of her senior career.

=== Senior Career ===
Ryzih competed at the 2012 Summer Olympics in London, England, finishing in joint 6th with a jump of 4.45 m. The following year, she finished in 8th at the 2013 World Championships in Moscow, Russia, with a jump of 4.55 m. The following year, she missed out on a European level medal by countback, jumping the same height (4.60 m) as both the silver and bronze medalists at the 2014 European Championships. She reached the final, but finished last, at the 2015 World Championships in Beijing, China.

At the 2016 European Championships in Amsterdam, Netherlands, Ryzih won a silver with a season's best jump of 4.70 m. Later, in August, she reached another Olympic final at the 2016 Summer Olympics in Rio de Janeiro, Brazil.

In February 2017, Ryzih competed in German Indoor Championships in Leipzig where she got the first place with a jump of 4.65m, with the silver and bronze medals going to 4.40 and 4.30m, respectively. She participated in 2017 European Athletics Indoor Championships meet on 4 March in Belgrade, Serbia, as a top contender and finished second place and getting silver medal with a jump of 4.75m, setting a new indoor personal best.

=== German Championships ===
Ryzih won 6 titles and some medals in German Athletics Championships (DM) in Pole Vault.

For outdoor, these include: 1st place in 2017 (Erfurt) with jump of 4.70 m; 2nd place in 2016 (Kassel) with jump of 4.65 m; 1st place in 2015 (Nuremberg) with jump of 4.60 m; 1st place in 2014 (Ulm) with a jump of 4.50 m; 2nd place in 2012 with a jump of 4.65 m; 2nd place in 2010 with a jump of 4.60 m; 3rd place in 2009 with a jump of 4.40 m.

For indoor, Ryzih was 1st place in 2017 (Leipzig) with a jump of 4.65 m. She also won the indoor title in 2015 in Karlsruhe with 4.55 m and won the 2011 title in Leipzig with a jump of 4.65 m.

In 2018 indoor national championships, Ryzih finished in second place with a jump of 4.46m. She prepared at a training camp in Spain for the 2018 European Championships in Berlin to be held in the Summer. She announced later that she was skipping the 2018 outdoor season including the European Championships for recovery.

=== 2019 to retirement ===
After healing her partial Achilles tear, Ryzih returned to competition in the Karlsruhe meeting of the 2019 IAAF World Indoor Tour by recording a jump of 4.63 m.

In 2020, Ryzih jumped 4.44 m at the Czech Indoor Gala in Ostrava, Czech Republic. She was due to compete at the 2020 Summer Olympics in Tokyo, Japan, but cancelled for health reasons.

Ryzih retired from competing in August 2022.

== Competition record ==
Year	Competition	Venue	Position	Notes
Representing Germany
2003	World Youth Championships	Sherbrooke, Canada	1st	4.05 m
2004	World Junior Championships	Grosseto, Italy	1st	4.30 m
2006	World Junior Championships	Beijing, China	4th (q)	4.00 m^{1}
2007	European Junior Championships	Hengelo, Netherlands	4th	4.20 m
2009	European U23 Championships	Kaunas, Lithuania	1st	4.50 m
2010	European Championships	Barcelona, Spain	3rd	4.65 m
2011	European Indoor Championships	Paris, France	7th	4.50 m
2012	European Championships	Helsinki, Finland	7th	4.40 m
2012	Olympic Games	London, United Kingdom	6th	4.45 m
2013	World Championships	Moscow, Russia	8th	4.55 m
2014	European Championships	Zürich, Switzerland	4th	4.60 m
2015	European Indoor Championships	Prague, Czech Republic	8th (q)	4.55 m^{2}
2015	World Championships	Beijing, China	12th	4.60 m
2016	European Championships	Amsterdam, Netherlands	2nd	4.70 m
2016	Olympic Games	Rio de Janeiro, Brazil	10th	4.50 m
2017	European Indoor Championships	Belgrade, Serbia	2nd	4.75 m PB
2017	World Championships	London, United Kingdom	5th	4.65 m
2018	World Indoor Championships	Birmingham, United Kingdom	–	NM
2019	World Championships	Doha, Qatar	17th	4.50 m

^{1}No mark in the final
^{2}Did not start in the final

== See also ==
- Athletics at the 2012 Summer Olympics – Women's pole vault
- Athletics at the 2016 Summer Olympics – Women's pole vault
- Germany all-time top lists – Pole vault
