= Giorgia Benecchi =

Italian pole vaulter (born 1989)

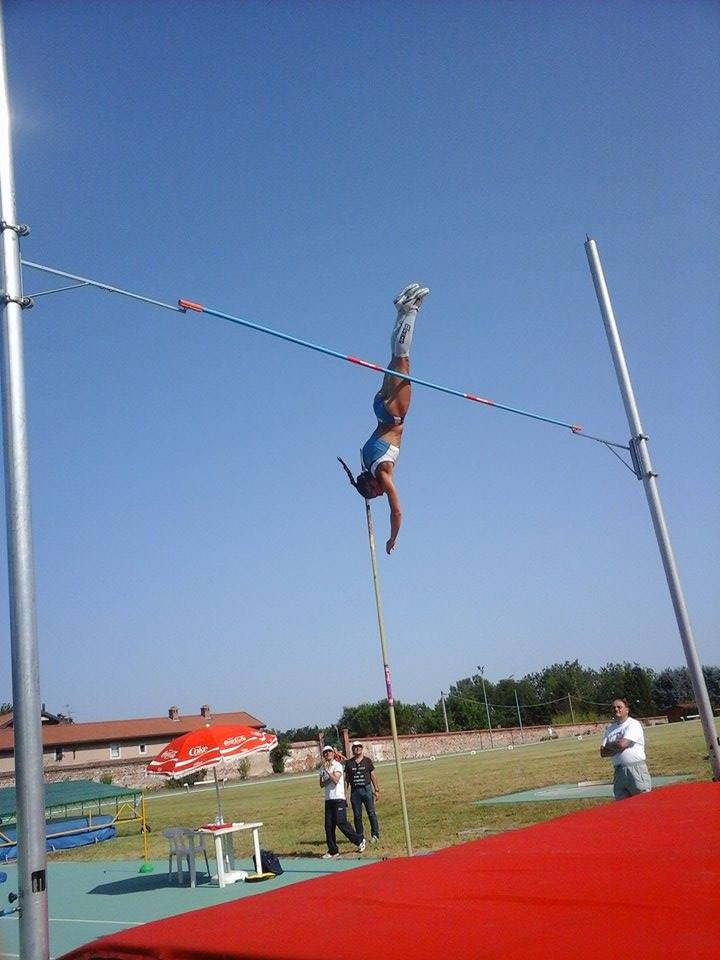

Personal information
- Nationality: Italian
- Born: July 9, 1989 (age 36) Parma, Italy
- Height: 1.64 m (5 ft 4 1/2 in)
- Weight: 55 kg (121 lb)

Sport
- Country: Italy
- Sport: Athletics
- Event: Pole vault
- Club: C.S. Esercito
- Coached by: Matteo Bini

Achievements and titles
- Personal best: Pole vault: 4.40 (2013)

Giorgia Benecchi (born 9 July 1989) is an Italian pole vaulter.

== Biography ==
Like many others pole vaulters, Benecchi came from artistic gymnastics, a sport in which she was very promising. She is also a friend of Italian pole vaulter Roberta Bruni.

== Personal bests ==
- Pole vault outdoor: 4.35 m ( (Italy) Modena, 19 June 2012)
- Pole vault indoor: 4.40 m ( (Italy) Ancona, 17 February 2013)

== Progression ==
Pole vault indoor

Her personal best of 4.40 m set in 2013 was the 35th best world performance of the year.

Year	Performance	Venue	Date	World Rank
2014	4.30	(Italy) Ancona	24 February	
2013	4.40	(Italy) Ancona	17 February	35th
2012	4.20	(Italy) Modena	12 February	
2012	4.20	(Italy) Ancona	26 February	
2011	4.35	(Italy) Aosta	29 January	
2010	4.36	(Italy) Ancona	14 February	

== Achievements ==
Year	Competition	Venue	Position	Event	Notes
2008	World Junior Championships	(Poland) Bydgoszcz	17th (q)	Pole vault	3.65 m
2009	European U23 Championships	(Lithuania) Kaunas	14th (q)	Pole vault	4.00 m
2011	European Indoor Championships	(France) Paris	NQ	Pole vault	3.90 m
2011	European U23 Championships	(Czech Republic) Ostrava	10th	Pole vault	3.90 m
2013	Mediterranean Games	(Turkey) Mersin	5th	Pole vault	4.30 m

== National titles ==
She has won two times the individual national championship.

- 1 win in the pole vault (2013)
- 1 win in the pole vault indoor (2014)

== See also ==
- Italian all-time lists - Pole vault
