= Minna Nikkanen =

Finnish pole vaulter (born 1988)

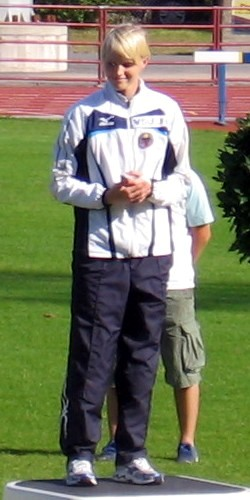
- Minna Nikkanen 2009

Personal information
- Born: April 9, 1988 (age 38) Somero, Finland
- Height: 1.69 m (5 ft 6 1/2 in)
- Weight: 53 kg (117 lb)

Sport
- Country: Finland
- Sport: Athletics
- Event: Pole Vault

Achievements and titles
- Personal best: Pole Vault: 460 cm
- Updated on 24 August 2015

Minna Marianne Nikkanen (born 9 April 1988) is a Finnish pole vaulter. Her personal best vault is 4.60 metres, achieved in August 2015 in Kuortane.

Nikkanen won gold medal in 2007 European Junior Championships (4.35 metres) and silver medal in 2009 European U23 Championships (4.45 metres). She competed at the World Championships in 2007 and in 2009 without reaching the final. She placed 10th in the World Championships in August 2015 with a vault which set the Finnish National Record.

== International competitions ==
Year	Competition	Venue	Position	Notes
Representing Finland
2003	European Junior Championships	Tampere, Finland	8th	3.90 m
2004	World Junior Championships	Grosseto, Italy	18th (q)	3.75 m
2005	World Youth Championships	Marrakesh, Morocco	6th	4.00 m
2006	World Junior Championships	Beijing, China	6th	4.10 m
2007	European Indoor Championships	Birmingham, United Kingdom	–	NM
2007	European Junior Championships	Hengelo, Netherlands	1st	4.35 m
2007	World Championships	Osaka, Japan	19th (q)	4.35 m
2009	European Indoor Championships	Turin, Italy	10th (q)	4.35 m
2009	European U23 Championships	Kaunas, Lithuania	2nd	4.45 m
2009	World Championships	Berlin, Germany	20th (q)	4.40 m
2010	European Championships	Barcelona, Spain	9th	4.35 m
2011	European Indoor Championships	Paris, France	4th	4.60 m
2012	European Championships	Helsinki, Finland	19th (q)	4.25 m
2012	Olympic Games	London, United Kingdom	26th (q)	4.25 m
2013	European Indoor Championships	Gothenburg, Sweden	13th (q)	4.36 m
2014	European Championships	Zurich, Switzerland	7th	4.35 m
2015	European Indoor Championships	Prague, Czech Republic	19th (q)	4.30 m
2015	World Championships	Beijing, China	10th	4.60 m NR
2016	European Championships	Amsterdam, Netherlands	9th	4.45 m
2016	Olympic Games	Rio de Janeiro, Brazil	13th (q)	4.55 m
2017	European Indoor Championships	Belgrade, Serbia	6th	4.55 m
2017	World Championships	London, United Kingdom	20th (q)	4.20 m
2018	European Championships	Berlin, Germany	13th (q)	4.35 m

== Personal best ==
Outdoor

- 4.60 m (Kuortane 2015)

Indoor

- 4.61 m (Växjö 2016)
