= Vanessa Vandy =

New Zealand-born Finnish film director, cinematographer and former pole vaulter

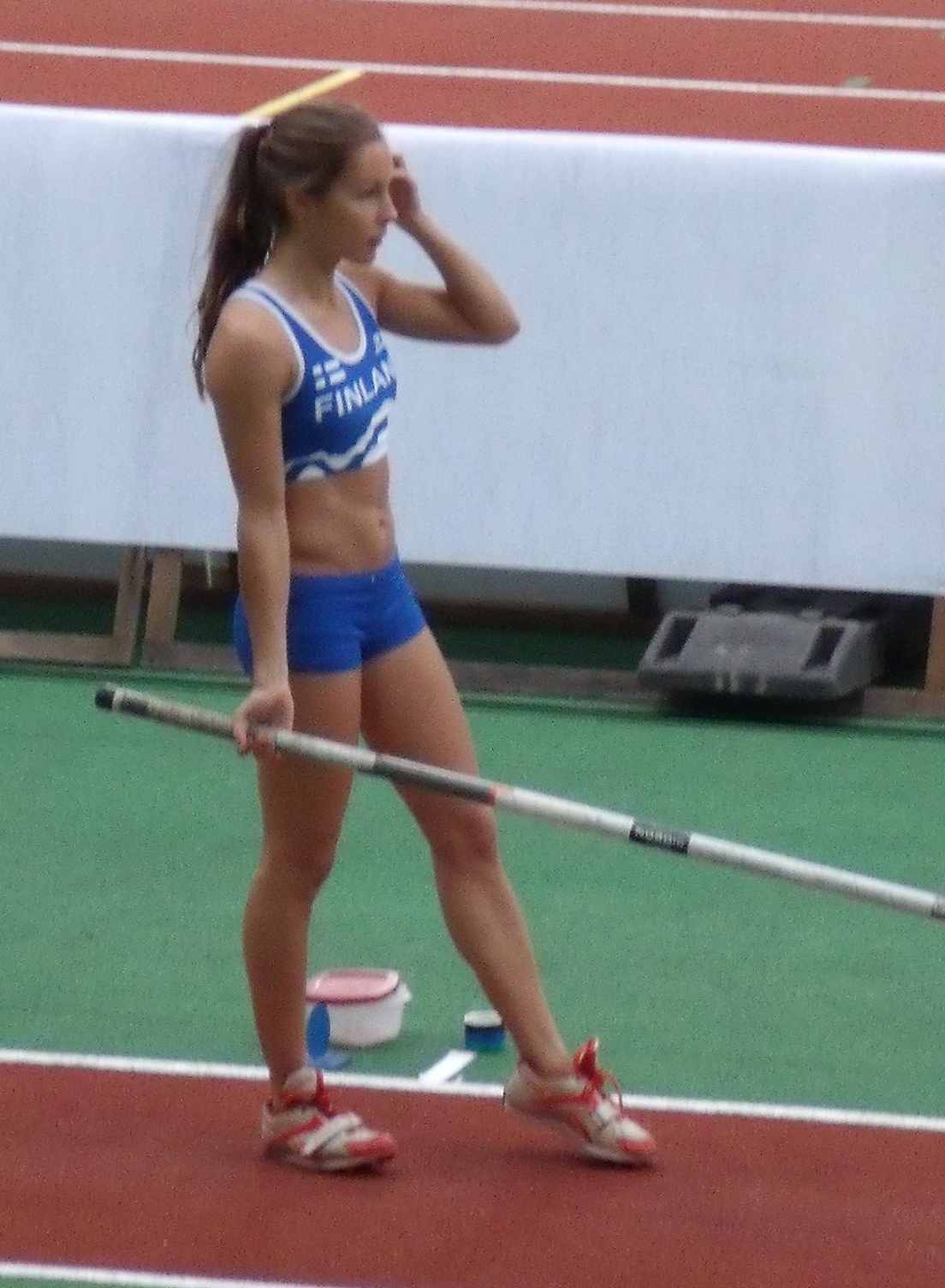
- Vandy at DécaNation, 2009

Personal information
- Full name: Vanessa Isabelle Vandy
- Nationality: FinlandNew Zealand
- Born: 14 May 1989 (age 37) Auckland, New Zealand
- Height: 1.61 m (5 ft 3 1/2 in)
- Weight: 50 kg (110 lb)
- Website: vanessavandy.com

Sport
- Country: Finland and New Zealand
- Sport: Athletics
- Event: Pole vault
- Club: Vasa Idrottssällskap (FIN)
- Coached by: Johan Westö

Achievements and titles
- Personal best: Pole vault: 4.36 m (2009)

Vanessa Isabelle Vandy (born 14 May 1989) is a New Zealand-born Finnish film director, cinematographer and former pole vaulter. She is a national outdoor and indoor champion for the pole vault, and also, a bronze medalist at the 2009 European Athletics Under-23 Championships in Kaunas, Lithuania.

== Film career ==
Vandy is currently working as a film director and cinematographer. Her style lies in her ability to move people, to capture their attention and to evoke an emotion. Her first short film, Farewell, was selected as a finalist in One Screen 2017 Film Festival's Free The Bid - new female director category.

== Athletic career ==
Born in Auckland to a New Zealand father and Finnish mother, Vandy holds a dual citizenship, and chose to represent her mother's birthplace Finland at numerous sporting events, including the Olympic games. At age ten, Vandy moved with her family to Vaasa, Finland, where she began pole vaulting at age 13. She eventually became a member of, and trained full-time at Vasa Idrottssällskap, under her personal and head coach Johan Westö.

In 2007, Vandy made her international debut at the European Junior Championships, where she achieved a seventh-place finish in the women's pole vault. She also set her personal best of 4.15 metres by winning the bronze medal at the Finnish Elite Series in Lahti, ahead of her teammate Minna Nikkanen, who flew over 4.05 metres. Shortly after the series, she continued to beat Nikkanen at the Sweden-match in Gothenburg, and most importantly, at the Finnish Indoor Championships in Joensuu, where she claimed her first ever career title in the pole vault.

The following year, Vandy reached her breakthrough season by vaulting her personal best of 4.31 metres at an athletics meet in Sopot, Poland. She also finished sixth at the 2008 IAAF World Junior Championships in Bydgoszcz, and won her second career title at the national outdoor championships in Tampere, which gave her a qualifying berth for the Olympics.

At the 2008 Summer Olympics in Beijing, Vandy successfully cleared a height of 4.00 metres in the women's pole vault, an event which was later dominated by world-record holder Yelena Isinbayeva of Russia. Vandy, however, failed to advance into the final, as she placed thirty-second overall in the qualifying rounds, tying her position with Tunisia's Leila Ben Youssef.

In 2009, Vandy extended her personal best of 4.36 metres by finishing second at the Elite World Championships in Lapua, behind her teammate Minna Nikkanen. She also won the bronze medal at the European Athletics Under-23 Championships in Kaunas, Lithuania, with a satisfying height of 4.35 metres.

In early 2011, Vandy announced her retirement from pole vault to focus on and pursue her career in filmmaking, having suffered knee problems for the past few years.
