= Claire Rachel Wilkinson =

American singer

Clairity
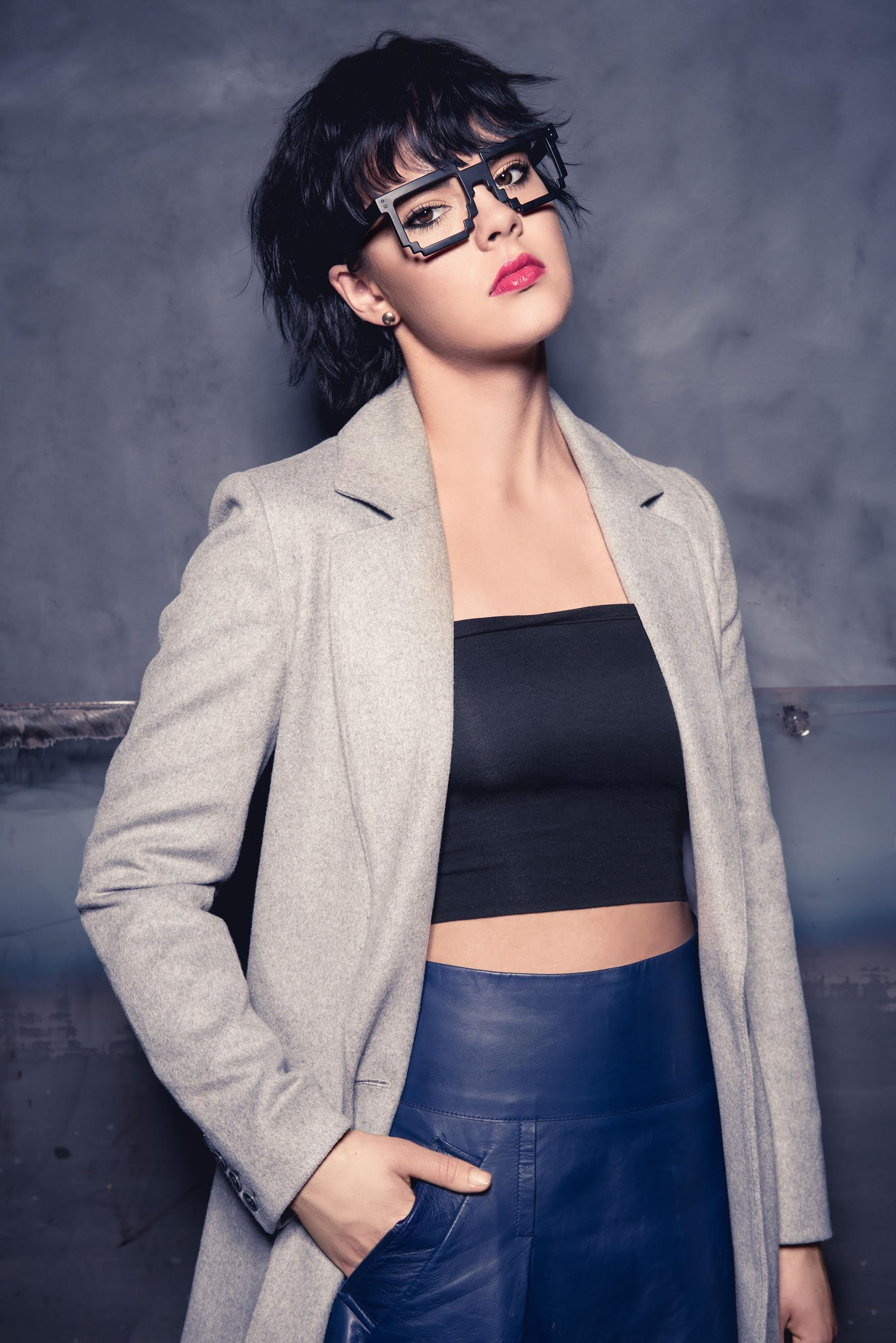

Background information
- Also known as: 7Chariot
- Born: Claire Rachel Wilkinson; July 24, 1997 (age 29); White House, Tennessee, U.S.
- Origin: Nashville, Tennessee, U.S. (7Chariot)
- Genres: Pop; synthpop; indie pop
- Occupations: Singer; songwriter
- Instruments: Vocals, keyboard
- Years active: 2014–present
- Labels: Republic; Lava; 0E0E

Claire Rachel Wilkinson, known by her stage name 7Chariot and previously known as Clairity, is an American singer and songwriter.

== Early life ==
Wilkinson was raised in White House, Tennessee and began taking voice lessons at age eight. She started writing songs at age 13 and began learning the keyboard by watching videos on YouTube. Wilkinson also sang in her school's choir before being homeschooled.

== Career ==
=== 2014 – 2017: Career beginnings as Clairity and Alienation EP ===
Wilkinson met Pebe Sebert, who set up writing sessions between Sebert's daughter, Kesha, and Wilkinson. Sebert also eventually introduced her to Kara DioGuardi, who then signed Wilkinson to a publishing deal with her label Arthouse Entertainment and introduced her to Jason Flom. He then signed her to Lava Records in January 2015.

Wilkinson released her debut single, "Sharks in the Swimming Pool" on March 17, 2015. The song was co-written by production duo Kinetics & One Love. She also performed at South by Southwest in March 2015. Her debut EP, "Alienation" was released on July 17, 2015. After the release, she performed at CMJ in New York as well as at Live in the Vineyard in Napa Valley. Wilkinson cited artists such as Coldplay, Imogen Heap, Sia, and Kate Nash as influences.

In 2016, Wilkinson worked on the single "Renaissance" with DJ Steve James, 17-year producer of Justin Bieber's song "Purpose". The song amassed over 4 million plays on Spotify in a month reaching No. 1 on both Spotify Global Viral 50 & US Viral 50. In addition, the song hit No. 1 on Hype Machine. That same year, her single "DNA" was featured in a trailer for CW's The 100, and the song "Exorcism" was featured on MTV's Teen Wolf. Additionally, her cover version of Coldplay's "Don't Panic" was used in the X-Men: Apocalypse TV spot for Super Bowl 50 and in the first full trailer for the film.

=== 2017–present: 7Chariot ===
In November 2017, Wilkinson released the single "Ricochet" with 0E0E Records, debuting under the name 7Chariot. She chose the name 7Chariot from the tarot card of the same name that her grandmother gave a reading for her when she was starting out as a musician. The single was highlighted as Clash Magazine's Track of the Day later that month. In March 2018, she released the single "Danger in Me." Wilkinson also featured on the song "Coldest Night" from the Attlas EP Charcoal Halo later that same year.

"Ricochet" and "Danger in Me" were included on the self-titled 7Chariot EP which was released in December 2019, also through 0E0E Records. Wilkinson explained that many of the songs were a sort of therapy that helped her cope with breaking from a major record label and toxic environments. The EP received praise and was called "addictive", "adorable", and "sky-reaching".

Wilkinson featured as vocalist on electronic artist Bakermat's single "Bad Dreams" from his album The Ringmaster in 2020.

== Discography ==
=== Extended plays ===
Title	Album details	Peak chart positions
Title	Album details	US
Alienation	Release date: July 17, 2015; Label: Republic, Lava; Formats: Extended play	—
7Chariot	Release date: December 6, 2019; Label: 0E0E Records; Formats: Extended play	—

=== Singles ===
==== As Clairity ====
Title	Year	Peak chart positions	Album
Title	Year	US	Album
"Sharks in the Swimming Pool"	2015	—	Non-album single
"DNA"	2015	—	Alienation
"Renaissance" (with Steve James)	2016	—	Non-album single
"Don't Panic"	2016	–	Non-album single
"Broken Things"	2016	–	Non-album single
"Love in the Light"	2016	–	Non-album single
"Words like Weapons"	2016	–	Non-album single

==== As 7Chariot ====
Title	Year	Peak chart positions	Album
Title	Year	US	Album
"Ricochet"	2017	–	7Chariot
"Danger in Me"	2018	–	7Chariot
"Pyrokinesis"	2018	–	7Chariot
