= Anastasia Savchenko =

Russian pole vaulter (born 1989)

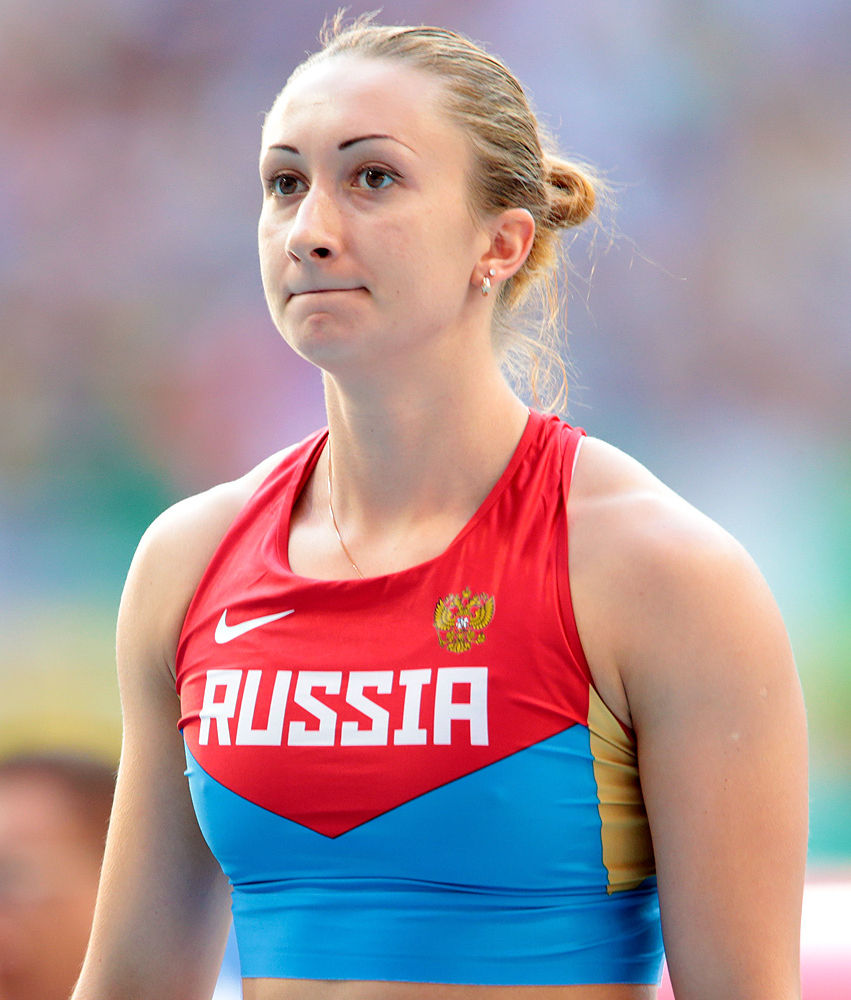
- Anastasia Savchenko at 2013 World Championships in Athletics

Personal information
- Born: 8 April 1989 (age 37)
- Height: 1.71 m (5 ft 7 1/2 in)
- Weight: 62 kg (137 lb)

Sport
- Country: Russia
- Sport: Athletics
- Event: Pole Vault
Medal record
Universiade
Gold medal – first place	2013 Kazan	Pole vault

Anastasia Vasilyevna Savchenko (Russian: Анастасия Васильевна Савченко; born 8 April 1989, Omsk) is a Russian pole vaulter.

== Achievements ==
Year	Competition	Venue	Position	Notes
Representing Russia
2009	European U23 Championships	Kaunas, Lithuania	8th	4.15 m
2011	European U23 Championships	Ostrava, Czech Republic	6th	4.20 m
2011	Universiade	Shenzhen, China	13th	4.10 m
2012	World Indoor Championships	Istanbul, Turkey	10th	4.45 m
2012	European Championships	Helsinki, Finland	4th	4.50 m
2012	Olympic Games	London, United Kingdom	26th (q)	4.25 m
2013	European Indoor Championship	Gothenburg, Sweden	5th	4.37 m
2013	Universiade	Kazan, Russia	1st	4.60 m
2013	World Championships	Moscow, Russia	5th	4.65 m
2014	World Indoor Championships	Sopot, Poland	11th	4.45 m
