= Tori Pena =

Irish-American pole vaulter (born 1987)

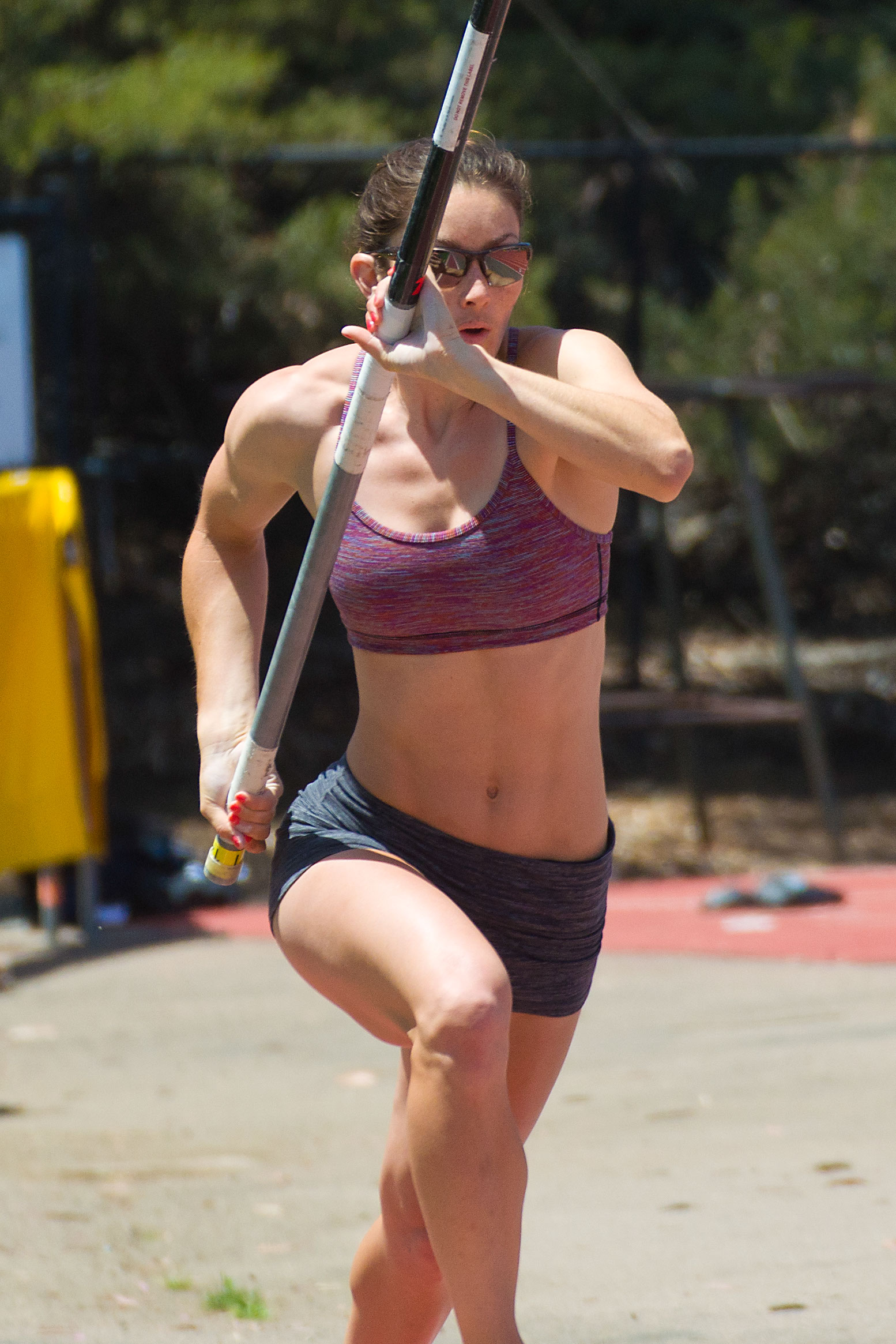
- Pena on 28 April 2012

Personal information
- Born: 30 July 1987 (age 39) Los Alamitos, California
- Height: 5 ft 6 in (168 cm)
- Weight: 126 lb (57 kg)

Sport
- Country: Ireland
- Sport: Athletics
- Event: Pole Vault

Achievements and titles
- Personal best: 4.60 m (2013)

Victoria "Tori" Peña (born 30 July 1987) is a pole vaulter with dual American and Irish citizenship who competes for Ireland in IAAF competition.

== Early life ==
Peña was born in Los Alamitos, California. Her father's family are of Mexican extraction, and her maternal grandmother Angela McCoy (née Coyle) was born in Derry. Peña lives in Huntington Beach, where she graduated from Edison High School. In 2003, she competed in Killarney at the World Irish Dancing Championships. She earned a degree in International Development Studies from the University of California, Los Angeles, and competed for the UCLA Bruins, although frequently hampered by injuries. Her Irish grandmother made her eligible for Irish citizenship, and in June 2010 she acquired dual citizenship, declared her intention to compete for Ireland, and registered with Finn Valley Athletic Club in County Donegal.

== Irish career ==
Peña's personal best of 4.35 metres (14 ft 3 1/2 in) was set shortly before she had acquired Irish citizenship, but was sufficient to qualify for the pole vault at the European Athletics championships in Barcelona. In July 2010 won the Irish national championships at Morton Stadium with an Irish record of 4.15 metres (13 ft 7 1/2 in), which she equalled in Barcelona. At the 2011 European Athletics Indoor Championships she set an Irish indoor record of 4.35 metres (14 ft 3 1/2 in), which she increased to 4.45 metres (14 ft 7 in) in 2012. At the San Diego Triton Invitational on 27 April 2012 she set an outdoor Irish record of 4.52 metres (14 ft 10 in). This qualified her for the 2012 Olympics, in the qualifying round of which she failed at the opening height of 4.10 metres (13 ft 5 1/2 in).
