= Athletics at the 2017 Summer Universiade – Women's pole vault =

The women's pole vault event at the 2017 Summer Universiade was held on 24 and 26 August at the Taipei Stadium.

== Medalists ==
Gold	Silver	Bronze
Iryna Zhuk; Belarus	Annika Roloff; Germany	Marta Onofre; Portugal

== Results ==
=== Qualification ===
Qualification: 4.00 m (Q) or at least 12 best (q) qualified for the final.

Rank	Group	Athlete	Nationality	3.30	3.45	3.60	3.70	3.80	3.90	4.00	Result	Notes
1	A	Anjuli Knäsche	Germany	–	–	–	–	–	–	o	4.00	Q
1	A	Maryna Kylypko	Ukraine	–	–	–	–	–	–	o	4.00	Q
1	A	Kamila Przybyła	Poland	–	–	–	–	–	–	o	4.00	Q
1	B	Marta Onofre	Portugal	–	–	–	–	–	–	o	4.00	Q
1	B	Annika Roloff	Germany	–	–	–	–	–	–	o	4.00	Q
1	B	Justyna Śmietanka	Poland	–	–	–	–	–	–	o	4.00	Q
1	B	Iryna Zhuk	Belarus	–	–	–	–	–	–	o	4.00	Q
8	A	Valeria Chiaraviglio	Argentina	–	–	–	–	xxo	o	o	4.00	Q
9	A	Aurelie De Ryck	Belgium	–	–	–	–	–	o	xo	4.00	Q
9	B	Line Renée Jensen	Denmark	–	–	–	o	o	o	xo	4.00	Q, =SB
9	B	Paige Ridout	Canada	–	–	–	–	o	o	xo	4.00	Q
12	B	Elien De Vocht	Belgium	–	–	–	–	xo	xo	xxx	3.90	q
13	B	Sonia Malavisi	Italy	–	–	–	–	o	xxx		3.80	
14	A	Leda Kroselj	Slovenia	o	o	o	xxx				3.60	
15	A	Tiina Tikk	Estonia	o	xxo	o	xxx				3.60	SB
16	B	Lin Tsai-ying	Chinese Taipei	o	o	xxx					3.45	
17	A	Caroline Ranners	Denmark	–	xxo	xxx					3.45	
18	A	Klarika Kaldmaa	Estonia	xxo	xxx						3.30	
	A	Robin Bone	Canada	–	–	–	xxx				NM	

=== Final ===
Rank	Athlete	Nationality	3.90	4.00	4.10	4.20	4.30	4.40	4.45	4.50	Result	Notes
1st place, gold medalist(s)	Iryna Zhuk	Belarus	–	–	o	–	o	o	xxx		4.40	
2nd place, silver medalist(s)	Annika Roloff	Germany	–	–	–	xo	o	o	–	xxx	4.40	
3rd place, bronze medalist(s)	Marta Onofre	Portugal	–	o	o	o	o	xo	xxx		4.40	=SB
4	Maryna Kylypko	Ukraine	–	–	o	xxo	o	xxo	xxx		4.40	
5	Justyna Śmietanka	Poland	–	–	xo	o	xo	xxx			4.30	
6	Anjuli Knäsche	Germany	–	o	xo	o	xxx				4.20	
7	Paige Ridout	Canada	o	o	xxo	xo	xxx				4.20	
8	Valeria Chiaraviglio	Argentina	o	o	o	xxx					4.10	
8	Kamila Przybyła	Poland	–	–	o	xxx					4.10	
10	Line Renée Jensen	Denmark	–	–	xo	xxx					4.10	PB
11	Aurelie De Ryck	Belgium	o	xo	xxo	xxx					4.10	
12	Elien De Vocht	Belgium	o	o	xxx						4.00	
