= 2016 European Athletics Championships – Women's pole vault =

Women's pole vault at the European Athletics Championships
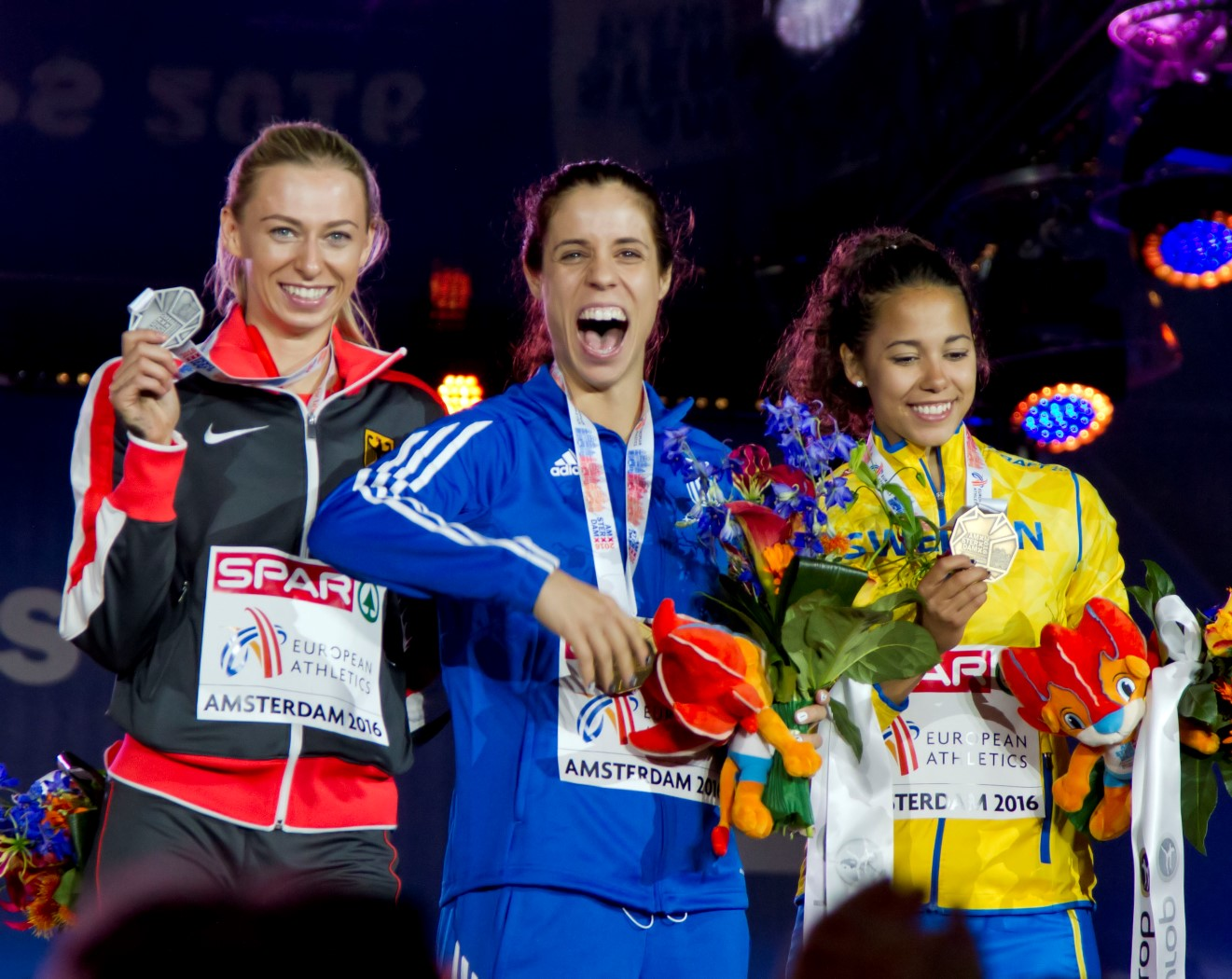
- Venue: Olympic Stadium
- Location: Amsterdam
- Dates: 7 July (qualification); 9 July (final)
- Competitors: 26 from 15 nations
- Winning height: 4.81 m CR

Medalists
| gold medal | Katerina Stefanidi | Greece |
| silver medal | Lisa Ryzih | Germany |
| bronze medal | Angelica Bengtsson | Sweden |

The women's pole vault at the 2016 European Athletics Championships took place at the Olympic Stadium on 7 and 9 July.

== Records ==
Standing records prior to the 2016 European Athletics Championships
| World record | Yelena Isinbayeva (RUS) | 5.06 m | Zürich, Switzerland | 28 August 2009 |
| European record | Yelena Isinbayeva (RUS) | 5.06 m | Zürich, Switzerland | 28 August 2009 |
| Championship record | Yelena Isinbayeva (RUS) | 4.80 m | Gothenburg, Sweden | 12 August 2006 |
| World Leading | Fabiana Murer (BRA) | 4.87 m | São Bernardo do Campo, Brazil | 3 July 2016 |
| World Leading | Yelena Isinbayeva (RUS) | 4.90 m^{[A]} | Cheboksary, Russia | 21 June 2016 |
| European Leading | Katerina Stefanidi (GRE) | 4.86 m | Athens, Greece | 8 June 2016 |
| European Leading | Yelena Isinbayeva (RUS) | 4.90 m^{[A]} | Cheboksary, Russia | 21 June 2016 |

^{A} During ARAF Suspension

== Schedule ==
| Date | Time | Round |
|---|---|---|
| 7 July 2016 | 10:05 | Qualification |
| 9 July 2016 | 19:20 | Final |

All times are local times (UTC+2)

== Results ==
=== Qualification ===
Qualification: 4.55 m (Q) or best 12 performances (q)

| Rank | Group | Name | Nationality | 4.00 | 4.20 | 4.35 | 4.45 | 4.50 | Result | Note |
|---|---|---|---|---|---|---|---|---|---|---|
| 1 | B | Katerina Stefanidi | Greece | – | – | – | – | xo | 4.50 | q |
| 2 | A | Femke Pluim | Netherlands | – | o | o | o | | 4.45 | q, =SB |
| 2 | A | Lisa Ryzih | Germany | – | – | – | o | | 4.45 | q |
| 4 | B | Angelica Moser | Switzerland | - | xo | o | o | r | 4.45 | q, PB |
| 4 | B | Martina Strutz | Germany | – | xo | o | o | r | 4.45 | q |
| 6 | A | Nikolía Kiriakopoúlou | Greece | – | – | xxo | o | | 4.45 | q |
| 7 | A | Michaela Meijer | Sweden | – | o | o | xo | | 4.45 | q |
| 8 | B | Angelica Bengtsson | Sweden | – | xxo | o | xo | r | 4.45 | q |
| 9 | A | Minna Nikkanen | Finland | – | xo | o | xxo | | 4.45 | q |
| 9 | A | Tina Šutej | Slovenia | – | xo | o | xxo | | 4.45 | q |
| 11 | B | Rianna Galiart | Netherlands | o | o | o | xxx | | 4.35 | q, SB |
| 11 | B | Wilma Murto | Finland | – | – | o | xxx | | 4.35 | q |
| 11 | B | Annika Roloff | Germany | – | o | o | xxx | | 4.35 | q |
| 11 | B | Iryna Yakaltsevich | Belarus | o | o | o | xxx | | 4.35 | q |
| 15 | B | Marta Onofre | Portugal | o | xo | o | xxx | | 4.35 | |
| 15 | A | Tori Pena | Ireland | – | xo | o | xxx | | 4.35 | |
| 17 | A | Maryna Kylypko | Ukraine | – | o | xo | xxx | | 4.35 | |
| 17 | B | Jiřina Ptáčníková | Czech Republic | – | – | xo | xxx | | 4.35 | |
| 19 | A | Fanny Smets | Belgium | xo | o | xo | xxx | | 4.35 | |
| 20 | B | Sonia Malavisi | Italy | o | o | xxx | | | 4.20 | |
| 21 | A | Justyna Śmietanka | Poland | xxo | xo | xxx | | | 4.20 | |
| 22 | A | Rebeka Šilhanová | Czech Republic | o | xxx | | | | 4.00 | |
| 23 | A | Lisa Gunnarsson | Sweden | xo | xxx | | | | 4.00 | |
| 24 | B | Chloe Henry | Belgium | xo | xxx | | | | 4.00 | |
| | B | Romana Maláčová | Czech Republic | – | xxx | | | | NM | |
| | A | Nicole Büchler | Switzerland | | | | | | DNS | |

=== Final ===
| Rank | Name | Nationality | 4.35 | 4.45 | 4.55 | 4.65 | 4.70 | 4.75 | 4.81 | 4.94 | Mark | Note |
|---|---|---|---|---|---|---|---|---|---|---|---|---|
| 1st place, gold medalist(s) | Katerina Stefanidi | Greece | – | – | o | o | o | – | xxo | xxx | 4.81 | CR |
| 2nd place, silver medalist(s) | Lisa Ryzih | Germany | – | – | xo | – | xo | r | | | 4.70 | |
| 3rd place, bronze medalist(s) | Angelica Bengtsson | Sweden | o | o | xo | o | xxx | | | | 4.65 | SB |
| 4 | Nikoleta Kyriakopoulou | Greece | xo | xo | o | xxx | | | | | 4.55 | |
| 5 | Michaela Meijer | Sweden | xo | o | xo | xxx | | | | | 4.55 | |
| 6 | Femke Pluim | Netherlands | xo | o | xxx | | | | | | 4.45 | =SB |
| 7 | Angelica Moser | Switzerland | o | xo | xxx | | | | | | 4.45 | =PB |
| 7 | Wilma Murto | Finland | o | xo | xxx | | | | | | 4.45 | |
| 9 | Minna Nikkanen | Finland | o | xxo | xxx | | | | | | 4.45 | |
| 10 | Martina Strutz | Germany | xo | xxo | xxx | | | | | | 4.45 | |
| 11 | Annika Roloff | Germany | o | xxx | | | | | | | 4.35 | |
| 12 | Iryna Yakaltsevich | Belarus | xxo | xxx | | | | | | | 4.35 | |
| | Tina Šutej | Slovenia | xxx | | | | | | | | NM | |
| | Rianna Galiart | Netherlands | xxx | | | | | | | | NM | |
