= 2015 European Athletics U23 Championships – Women's pole vault =

The women's pole vault event at the 2015 European Athletics U23 Championships was held in Tallinn, Estonia, at Kadriorg Stadium on 9 and 10 July.

== Medalists ==
Gold	Angelica Bengtsson; Sweden
Silver	Michaela Meijer; Sweden
Bronze	Natalya Demidenko; Russia

== Results ==
=== Final ===
10 July

Rank	Name	Nationality	Attempts								Result	Notes
Rank	Name	Nationality	4.05	4.15	4.25	4.35	4.40	4.50	4.55	4.60	Result	Notes
1st place, gold medalist(s)	Angelica Bengtsson	Sweden	–	–	o	–	o	o	o	xxx	4.55	
2nd place, silver medalist(s)	Michaela Meijer	Sweden	–	o	o	–	o	o	x–	xx	4.50	
3rd place, bronze medalist(s)	Natalya Demidenko	Russia	o	o	o	o	x–	xx			4.35	SB
4	Iryna Yakaltsevich	Belarus	o	o	o	xxx					4.25	NUR =PB
4	Femke Pluim	Netherlands	–	–	o	xxx					4.25	
4	Kira Grünberg	Austria	–	o	o	xxx					4.25	
7	Anjuli Knäsche	Germany	o	o	xxx						4.15	
7	Lilli Schnitzerling	Germany	o	o	xxx						4.15	
7	Ninon Guillon-Romarin	France	o	o	xxx						4.15	
10	Aino Siitonen	Finland	xo	o	xxx						4.15	=PB
11	Yeoryia Stefanídi	Greece	o	xxx							4.05	
11	Sonia Malavisi	Italy	o	–	xxx						4.05	
11	Erica Hjerpe	Finland	o	xxx							4.05	

=== Qualifications ===
9 July

Rank	Name	Nationality	Attempts						Result	Notes
Rank	Name	Nationality	3.55	3.70	3.85	4.00	4.10	4.15	Result	Notes
1	Angelica Bengtsson	Sweden	–	–	–	–	–	o	4.15	q
1	Aino Siitonen	Finland	–	–	o	o	o	o	4.15	=PB q
3	Sonia Malavisi	Italy	–	–	o	xo	o	o	4.15	q
3	Anjuli Knäsche	Germany	–	–	o	o	xo	o	4.15	q
3	Ninon Guillon-Romarin	France	–	–	o	xo	o	o	4.15	q
6	Lilli Schnitzerling	Germany	–	–	o	o	o	xxo	4.15	q
7	Iryna Yakaltsevich	Belarus	–	–	o	o	xo	xxo	4.15	NUR q
8	Yeoryia Stefanídi	Greece	–	o	o	o	xxo	xxo	4.15	=PB q
9	Femke Pluim	Netherlands	–	–	–	–	o		4.10	q
9	Michaela Meijer	Sweden	–	–	–	–	o		4.10	q
9	Erica Hjerpe	Finland	–	–	–	o	o	xxx	4.10	q
9	Natalya Demidenko	Russia	–	–	–	o	o		4.10	q
9	Kira Grünberg	Austria	–	–	–	–	o		4.10	q
14	Diána Szabó	Hungary	–	o	o	xxo	xxo	xxx	4.10	PB
14	Clara Amat	Spain	–	–	xo	xo	xxo	xxx	4.10	=PB
16	Maryna Kylypko	Ukraine	–	–	xo	xxo	xxo	xxx	4.10	
17	Maialen Axpe	Spain	xxo	o	xxo	o	xxx		4.00	
18	Jasmine Moser	Switzerland	–	–	xo	xxo	xxx		4.00	
19	Mélanie Fasel	Switzerland	–	o	o	xxx			3.85	
19	Justyna Śmietanka	Poland	–	o	o	xxx			3.85	
21	Buse Arıkazan	Turkey	–	xxo	o	xxx			3.85	
22	Malen Ruiz de Azua	Spain	o	o	xo	xxx			3.85	
22	Letizia Marzenta	Italy	–	–	xo	xxx			3.85	
22	Rebeka Šilhanová	Czech Republic	–	–	xo	xxx			3.85	
25	Nuša Maver	Slovenia	–	o	xxx				3.70	
25	Getter Marie Lemberg	Estonia	o	o	xxx				3.70	
25	Elien De Vocht	Belgium	–	o	xxx				3.70	
28	Hanna Jansson	Sweden	–	xo	xxx				3.70	
29	Angela Metzger	Switzerland	–	xxo	xxx				3.70	
	Anastasiya Sadovnikova	Russia	xxx						NH	
	Margaux Quirin	Belgium	–	–	xxx				NH	

== Participation ==
According to an unofficial count, 31 athletes from 20 countries participated in the event.

- Austria (1)
- Belarus (1)
- Belgium (2)
- Czech Republic (1)
- Estonia (1)
- Finland (2)
- France (1)
- Germany (2)
- Greece (1)
- Hungary (1)
- Italy (2)
- Netherlands (1)
- Poland (1)
- Russia (2)
- Slovenia (1)
- Spain (3)
- Sweden (3)
- Switzerland (3)
- Turkey (1)
- Ukraine (1)
