= Athletics at the 2020 Summer Olympics – Women's pole vault =

Women's pole vault at the Games of the XXXII Olympiad
- Olympic Athletics
- Venue: Japan National Stadium
- Dates: 2 August 2021 (qualifying); 5 August 2021 (final)
- Competitors: 31 from 19 nations
- Winning height: 4.90

Medalists
1st place, gold medalist(s)		Katie Nageotte	United States
2nd place, silver medalist(s)		Anzhelika Sidorova	ROC
3rd place, bronze medalist(s)		Holly Bradshaw	Great Britain

The women's pole vault event at the 2020 Summer Olympics took place on 2 and 5 August 2021 at the Japan National Stadium. 31 athletes from 19 nations competed. In her first Olympics, 30-year-old American Katie Nageotte won the gold medal by 5cm with a clearance of 4.90 metres. The silver medal went to Russian worldclea champion Anzhelika Sidorova and the bronze to Holly Bradshaw of Great Britain.

== Summary ==
Fifteen women qualified for the final by clearing 4.55 m. Thirteen the opening height of 4.50 m, but the three who struggled at that height were among the favorites; defending champion Katerina Stefanidi, American champion Katie Nageotte and former junior world record holder Angelica Bengtsson each were down to their last attempt. At the next height, 4.70 m, only four were able to get over the bar; World Champion Anzhelika Sidorova on her first attempt; seven-time British Champion Holly Bradshaw and Nageotte on their second; and again on her final attempt, Stefanidi. With a perfect series going, Sidorova had the lead, Bradshaw held the edge over Nageotte with Stefanidi off the podium as they moved the bar up to 4.80 m, Stefanidi missed, Sidorova to maintain her perfect series, Bradshaw missed and Nageotte made it to move into second position. Bradshaw and Stefanidi on their second attempt, so the bar moved up to 4.85 m. Stefanidi missed her first attempt again while the other three on their first attempt. With nothing to be gained by a clearance, Stefanidi passed to the next height 4.90 m. Only 9 women have ever 4.90 m, all of these were among that group. Nobody on their first attempt and when Stefanidi missed on her second and because of the earlier miss, final attempt, the medalists had been decided. Sidorova and Bradshaw missed again, then Nageotte the height on her second attempt to move into the gold medal position. Sidorova passed her third attempt to make a single attempt at 4.95 m for gold. Bradshaw missed equalling her personal best and finished with the bronze medal. Sidorova aborted her attempt at 4.95 m passing under the bar leaving Nageotte with gold. After celebrating, Nageotte took one attempt at 5.01 m to try to become third of all time but after already securing gold, she didn't have the fire, quitting halfway down the runway.

== Background ==
This was the 6th appearance of the event, having appeared at every Summer Olympics since 2000.

== Qualification ==
A National Olympic Committee (NOC) could enter up to 3 qualified athletes in the women's pole vault event if all athletes meet the entry standard or qualify by ranking during the qualifying period. (The limit of 3 has been in place since the 1930 Olympic Congress.) The qualifying standard is 4.70 metres. This standard was "set for the sole purpose of qualifying athletes with exceptional performances unable to qualify through the IAAF World Rankings pathway." The world rankings, based on the average of the best five results for the athlete over the qualifying period and weighted by the importance of the meet, will then be used to qualify athletes until the cap of 32 is reached.

The qualifying period was originally from 1 May 2019 to 29 June 2020. Due to the COVID-19 pandemic, the period was suspended from 6 April 2020 to 30 November 2020, with the end date extended to 29 June 2021. The world rankings period start date was also changed from 1 May 2019 to 30 June 2020; athletes who had met the qualifying standard during that time were still qualified, but those using world rankings would not be able to count performances during that time. The qualifying time standards could be obtained in various meets during the given period that have the approval of the IAAF. Both outdoor and indoor meets are eligible. The most recent Area Championships may be counted in the ranking, even if not during the qualifying period.

NOCs can also use their universality place—each NOC can enter one female athlete regardless of time if they had no female athletes meeting the entry standard for an athletics event—in the pole vault.

== Competition format ==
The 2020 competition continued to use the two-round format introduced in 1912. There were two distinct rounds of vaulting with results between rounds. Vaulters were eliminated if they had three consecutive failures, whether at a single height or between multiple heights if they attempted to advance before clearing a height.

The qualifying round had the bar set at various heights up to a qualifying standard (to be determined closer to the start of the Games; 4.60 metres in 2016). All jumpers clearing that standard advanced to the final. A minimum of 12 jumpers advanced; if fewer than 12 achieved the qualifying standard, the top 12 (including ties after use of the countback rules) advanced.

The final had jumps starting typically just below the qualifying standard and increasing gradually. The final continued until all jumpers are eliminated.

=== Women's pole vault ===
Qualification standard	No. of athletes	NOC	Nominated athletes
Entry standard – 4.70	3	Greece	Nikoleta Kyriakopoulou; Eleni-Klaoudia Polak; Katerina Stefanidi
Entry standard – 4.70	3	United States	Morgann LeLeux; Sandi Morris; Katie Nageotte
Entry standard – 4.70	2	Canada	Anicka Newell; Alysha Newman
Entry standard – 4.70	2	China	Li Ling; Xu Huiqin
Entry standard – 4.70	2	Sweden	Angelica Bengtsson; Michaela Meijer
Entry standard – 4.70	1	Australia	Nina Kennedy
Entry standard – 4.70	1	ROC	Anzhelika Sidorova
Entry standard – 4.70	1	Belarus	Iryna Zhuk
Entry standard – 4.70	1	Cuba	Yarisley Silva
Entry standard – 4.70	1	Great Britain	Holly Bradshaw
Entry standard – 4.70	1	Italy	Roberta Bruni
Entry standard – 4.70	1	Slovenia	Tina Šutej
Entry standard – 4.70	1	Switzerland	Angelica Moser
Entry standard – 4.70	1	Ukraine	Maryna Kylypko
Entry standard – 4.70	1	Venezuela	Robeilys Peinado
World ranking	2	Finland	Elina Lampela; Wilma Murto
World ranking	1	Australia	Liz Parnov
World ranking	1	Belgium	Fanny Smets
World ranking	1	Czech Republic	Romana Maláčová
World ranking	1	Germany	Lisa Ryzih
World ranking	1	Italy	Elisa Molinarolo
World ranking	1	Norway	Lene Retzius
World ranking	1	Switzerland	Andrina Hodel
World ranking	1	Ukraine	Yana Hladiychuk
Total	32		

== Records ==
Prior to this competition, the existing world, Olympic, and area records were as follows.

World record	Yelena Isinbayeva (RUS)	5.06	Zürich, Switzerland	28 August 2009
Olympic record	Yelena Isinbayeva (RUS)	5.05	Beijing, China	18 August 2008

Area	Height (m)	Athlete	Nation
Africa (records)	4.42	Elmarie Gerryts	South Africa
Asia (records)	4.72	Li Ling	China
Europe (records)	5.06 WR	Yelena Isinbayeva	Russia
North, Central America and Caribbean (records)	5.03	Jenn Suhr	United States
Oceania (records)	4.94	Eliza McCartney	New Zealand
South America (records)	4.87	Fabiana Murer	Brazil

== Schedule ==
All times are Japan Standard Time (UTC+9)

The women's pole vault took place over two separate days.

Date	Time	Round
Monday, 2 August 2021	19:00	Qualifying
Thursday, 5 August 2021	19:00	Final

== Result ==
=== Qualification ===
Qualification Rules: Qualifying performance 4.70 (Q) or at least 12 best performers (q) advance to the Final.

Rank	Group	Athlete	Nation	4.25	4.40	4.55	Height	Notes
1	B	Holly Bradshaw	Great Britain	—	—	o	4.55	q
1	A	Nikoleta Kyriakopoulou	Greece	o	o	o	4.55	q
1	A	Katie Nageotte	United States	—	—	o	4.55	q
1	B	Anicka Newell	Canada	—	o	o	4.55	q
1	A	Robeilys Peinado	Venezuela	—	o	o	4.55	q
1	B	Anzhelika Sidorova	ROC	—	—	o	4.55	q
1	A	Tina Šutej	Slovenia	o	o	o	4.55	q
8	A	Wilma Murto	Finland	o	o	xo	4.55	q
8	B	Yarisley Silva	Cuba	—	o	xo	4.55	q
8	B	Katerina Stefanidi	Greece	—	—	xo	4.55	q
8	A	Iryna Zhuk	Belarus	—	o	xo	4.55	q
12	A	Angelica Bengtsson	Sweden	o	xo	xo	4.55	q
13	B	Morgann LeLeux	United States	—	o	xxo	4.55	q
13	B	Xu Huiqin	China	—	o	xxo	4.55	q
15	A	Maryna Kylypko	Ukraine	o	xo	xxo	4.55	q
16	B	Michaela Meijer	Sweden	o	o	xxx	4.40	
16	A	Sandi Morris	United States	—	o	xxx	4.40	
18	A	Elisa Molinarolo	Italy	xo	o	xxx	4.40	
19	A	Eleni-Klaoudia Polak	Greece	xxo	o	xxx	4.40	
20	B	Angelica Moser	Switzerland	—	xo	xxx	4.40	
21	B	Yana Hladiychuk	Ukraine	xxo	xo	xxx	4.40	
22	A	Nina Kennedy	Australia	—	xxo	xxx	4.40	
23	B	Romana Maláčová	Czech Republic	xo	xxo	xxx	4.40	
24	B	Roberta Bruni	Italy	o	xxx		4.25	
24	A	Andrina Hodel	Switzerland	o	xxx		4.25	
24	B	Liz Parnov	Australia	o	xxx		4.25	
27	B	Fanny Smets	Belgium	xo	xxx		4.25	
27	B	Lene Retzius	Norway	xo	xxx		4.25	
—	A	Li Ling	China	—	—	xxx	NM	
—	B	Elina Lampela	Finland	xxx			NM	
—	A	Alysha Newman	Canada	xxx			NM	

=== Final ===
Rank	Athlete	Nation	4.50	4.70	4.80	4.85	4.90	4.95	5.01	Height	Notes
1st place, gold medalist(s)	Katie Nageotte	United States	xxo	xo	o	o	xo	—	xr	4.90	
2nd place, silver medalist(s)	Anzhelika Sidorova	ROC	o	o	o	o	xx–	x		4.85	
3rd place, bronze medalist(s)	Holly Bradshaw	Great Britain	o	xo	xo	o	xxx			4.85	
4	Katerina Stefanidi	Greece	xxo	xxo	xo	x–	xx			4.80	=SB
5	Maryna Kylypko	Ukraine	o	xxx						4.50	
5	Tina Šutej	Slovenia	o	xxx						4.50	
5	Wilma Murto	Finland	o	xxx						4.50	
8	Yarisley Silva	Cuba	xo	xxx						4.50	
8	Xu Huiqin	China	xo	xxx						4.50	
8	Nikoleta Kyriakopoulou	Greece	xo	xxx						4.50	
8	Robeilys Peinado	Venezuela	xo	xxx						4.50	
8	Iryna Zhuk	Belarus	xo	xxx						4.50	
13	Angelica Bengtsson	Sweden	xxo	xxx						4.50	
—	Morgann LeLeux	United States	xxx								NM
—	Anicka Newell	Canada	xxx								NM
