= Athletics at the 2019 Pan American Games – Women's pole vault =

Women's pole vault at the 2019 Pan American Games
- Venue: Athletics Stadium
- Dates: August 8
- Competitors: 11 from 8 nations
- Winning height: 4.75

Medalists
Gold medal	Yarisley Silva	Cuba
Silver medal	Katie Nageotte	United States
Bronze medal	Alysha Newman	Canada

The women's pole vault competition of the athletics events at the 2019 Pan American Games took place on 8 August at the 2019 Pan American Games Athletics Stadium. The defending Pan American Games champion was Yarisley Silva from Cuba, who again won the gold medal. It marked her third successive championship and fourth straight medal.

== Summary ==
Five throws at the event were over 4.55m, with Alysha Newman and Katie Nageotte still with perfect rounds going. At 4.65m, defending champion Yarisley Silva got over on her first attempt taking the lead. Nageotte got over on her second attempt and when nobody else could make the height, Newman was left with bronze. At 4.70m, Nageotte reversed the situation, taking the lead by making it on her second attempt while Silva had failed two times straight. With little to gain by clearing 4.70m, Silva passed to take her last chance, do or die, at 4.75 m (15 ft 7 in). After Nageotte missed once, Silva cleared to take the lead. Nageotte tried once more at 4.75m and then passed to 4.80. After she had exhausted her attempts, Silva's third championship in a row was confirmed.

== Records ==
Prior to this competition, the existing world and Pan American Games records were as follows:

World record	Elena Isinbaeva (RUS)	5.06	Zürich, Switzerland	August 28, 2009
Pan American Games record	Yarisley Silva (CUB)	4.85	Toronto, Canada	July 23, 2015

== Schedule ==
Date	Time	Round
August 8, 2019	15:25	Final

== Results ==
All times shown are in meters.

KEY:	q	Fastest non-qualifiers	Q	Qualified	NR	National record	PB	Personal best	SB	Seasonal best	DQ	Disqualified

=== Final ===
The results were as follows:

Rank	Name	Nationality	3.95	4.10	4.25	4.35	4.45	4.55	4.65	4.70	4.75	4.80	Mark	Notes
1st place, gold medalist(s)	Yarisley Silva	Cuba	–	–	o	xxo	o	o	o	xx-	o	–	4.75	SB
2nd place, silver medalist(s)	Katie Nageotte	United States	–	–	–	–	o	o	xo	xo	xx-	x	4.70	
3rd place, bronze medalist(s)	Alysha Newman	Canada	–	–	–	o	o	o	xxx				4.55	
4	Olivia Gruver	United States	–	–	o	o	xo	xo	xxx				4.55	
5	Robeilys Peinado	Venezuela	–	–	–	xo	xo	xo	xxx				4.55	
6	Kelsie Ahbe	Canada	–	–	xxo	o	xxx						4.35	
7	Katherine Castillo	Colombia	–	o	o	xxx							4.25	NR
8	Juliana Campos	Brazil	–	o	xxx								4.10	
9	Nicole Hein	Peru	o	xxx									3.95	
9	Diamara Planell	Puerto Rico	o	xxx									3.95	
	Rosaidi Robles	Cuba	xxx										NH	
