= Athletics at the 2010 South American Games – Women's pole vault =

The Women's Pole Vault event at the 2010 South American Games was held on March 22 at 17:00. The competition did not meet the requirement for the minimum number of 4 participating nations to be eligible for the South American Games. However, it could not be retrieved whether the event counted solely for the South American Under-23 Championships or not.

== Medalists ==
Gold	Silver	Bronze
Sara Pereira; Brazil	Raissa Schubert; Brazil	Diana Leyton; Colombia

== Records ==
Standing records prior to the 2010 South American Games
World record	Yelena Isinbayeva	Russia	5.06m	Zurich, Switzerland	28 August 2009
World leading	Yarisley Silva	Cuba	4.40m	Havana, Cuba	11 February 2010
South American record	Fabiana Murer	Brazil	4.82m	Rio de Janeiro, Brazil	7 June 2009
South American U23 record	Keisa Monterola	Venezuela	4.30m	Marrakesh, Morocco	16 July 2005

== Results ==
Results were published.

=== Final ===
Rank	Athlete	Nationality	Attempt									Best Result	Notes
Rank	Athlete	Nationality	3.50	3.55	3.60	3.65	3.70	3.75	3.80	3.85	4.00	Best Result	Notes
1st place, gold medalist(s)	Sara Pereira	Brazil	–	–	–	o	–	xo	o	xo	xxx	3.85	
2nd place, silver medalist(s)	Raissa Schubert	Brazil	–	–	–	xo	–	xo	o	xxx		3.80	
3rd place, bronze medalist(s)	Diana Leyton	Colombia	–	–	–	–	xxo	–	xxx			3.70	
4	Angie Carolina Hernández	Colombia	xxo	–	xxx							3.50	
	Valeria Chiaraviglio	Argentina	–	–	xxx							NM	

== See also ==
- 2010 South American Under-23 Championships in Athletics
