= 2018 European Athletics Championships – Women's pole vault =

Women's pole vault at the 2018 European Athletics Championships
- Venue: Olympic Stadium
- Location: Berlin
- Dates: August 7 (qualification); August 9 (final)
- Competitors: 25 from 16 nations
- Winning height: 4.85

Medalists
gold medal	Katerina Stefanidi	Greece
silver medal	Nikoleta Kyriakopoulou	Greece
bronze medal	Holly Bradshaw	Great Britain

The women's pole vault at the 2018 European Athletics Championships took place at the Olympic Stadium on 7 and 9 August.

== Records ==
Standing records prior to the 2018 European Athletics Championships
World record	Yelena Isinbayeva (RUS)	5.06 m	Zürich, Switzerland	28 August 2009
European record	Yelena Isinbayeva (RUS)	5.06 m	Zürich, Switzerland	28 August 2009
Championship record	Katerina Stefanidi (GRE)	4.81 m	Amsterdam, Netherlands	9 July 2016
World Leading	Sandi Morris (USA)	4.95 m	Greenville, United States	27 July 2018
European Leading	Anzhelika Sidorova (ANA)	4.85 m	Monaco	20 July 2018
Broken records during the 2018 European Athletics Championships
Championship record	Katerina Stefanidi (GRE)	4.85 m	Berlin, Germany	9 August 2018

== Schedule ==
Date	Time	Round
7 August 2018	19:05	Qualification
9 August 2018	19:20	Final

All times are local times (UTC+2)

== Results ==
=== Qualification ===
Qualification: 4.55 m (Q) or best 12 performances (q)

Rank	Group	Name	Nationality	4.00	4.20	4.35	4.45	4.50	4.55	Result	Notes
1	B	Katerina Stefanidi	Greece	–	–	–	–	–	o	4.55	Q
2	B	Holly Bradshaw	Great Britain	–	–	–	–	o	r	4.50	q
2	A	Anzhelika Sidorova	Authorised Neutral Athletes	–	–	–	–	o	r	4.50	q
4	A	Ninon Guillon-Romarin	France	–	–	–	o	–		4.45	q
4	B	Nikoleta Kyriakopoulou	Greece	–	–	–	o	r		4.45	q
4	B	Maryna Kylypko	Ukraine	–	o	o	o	r		4.45	q
4	B	Olga Mullina	Authorised Neutral Athletes	–	o	o	o	r		4.45	q
4	B	Iryna Zhuk	Belarus	–	o	o	o	–r		4.45	q
9	A	Eléni-Klaoúdia Pólak	Greece	xo	xo	xo	o	–		4.45	q
10	A	Amálie Švábíková	Czech Republic	xo	xxo	o	xo	–		4.45	q
11	A	Angelica Bengtsson	Sweden	–	–	xo	xxo	–		4.45	q
12	B	Carolin Hingst	Germany	o	xo	o	xxx			4.35	q
13	B	Lisa Gunnarsson	Sweden	–	xxo	o	xxx			4.35	
13	B	Minna Nikkanen	Finland	–	xxo	o	xxx			4.35	=SB
15	A	Lucy Bryan	Great Britain	o	o	xo	xxx			4.35	=SB
15	B	Marion Lotout	France	–	o	xo	xxx			4.35	
17	A	Wilma Murto	Finland	–	o	xxo	xxx			4.35	
17	A	Jacqueline Otchere	Germany	o	o	xxo	xxx			4.35	
19	B	Maialen Axpe	Spain	o	xo	xxo	xxx			4.35	
20	A	Angelica Moser	Switzerland	–	o	xxx				4.20	
20	B	Justyna Śmietanka	Poland	–	o	xxx				4.20	
22	A	Mónica Clemente	Spain	o	xo	xxx				4.20	
22	A	Lene Retzius	Norway	o	xo	xxx				4.20	
24	B	Molly Caudery	Great Britain	xxo	xo	xxx				4.20	
25	A	Femke Pluim	Netherlands	–	xxo	xxx				4.20	
25	A	Tina Šutej	Slovenia	o	xxo	xxx				4.20	
27	A	Stefanie Dauber	Germany	o	xxx					4.00	

=== Final ===
Rank	Athlete	Nationality	4.30	4.45	4.55	4.65	4.70	4.75	4.80	4.85	4.96	Result	Notes
1st place, gold medalist(s)	Katerina Stefanidi	Greece	–	–	–	o	–	o	o	xxo	xxx	4.85	CR
2nd place, silver medalist(s)	Nikoleta Kyriakopoulou	Greece	–	o	xo	o	o	o	xo	xxx		4.80	SB
3rd place, bronze medalist(s)	Holly Bradshaw	Great Britain	–	–	o	o	–	xxo	xxx			4.75	
4	Anzhelika Sidorova	Authorised Neutral Athletes	–	–	o	–	xxo	–	xxx			4.70	
5	Ninon Guillon-Romarin	France	–	o	o	o	xxx					4.65	
6	Angelica Bengtsson	Sweden	–	o	xo	xo	xxx					4.65	
7	Iryna Zhuk	Belarus	o	xo	xxo	xxx						4.55	
8	Maryna Kylypko	Ukraine	xo	xo	xxx							4.45	
9	Carolin Hingst	Germany	o	xxx								4.30	
9	Amálie Švábíková	Czech Republic	o	xxx								4.30	
11	Olga Mullina	Authorised Neutral Athletes	xo	xxx								4.30	
	Eléni-Klaoúdia Pólak	Greece	xxx									NM	
