= Athletics at the 2016 Summer Olympics – Women's pole vault =

Women's pole vault at the Games of the XXXI Olympiad
- Venue: Olympic Stadium
- Date: 16–19 August 2016
- Competitors: 38 from 24 nations
- Winning height: 4.85 m

Medalists
1st place, gold medalist(s)		Katerina Stefanidi	Greece
2nd place, silver medalist(s)		Sandi Morris	United States
3rd place, bronze medalist(s)		Eliza McCartney	New Zealand

The women's pole vault competition at the 2016 Summer Olympics in Rio de Janeiro, Brazil. The event was held at the Olympic Stadium between 16–19 August.

== Summary ==
It took a clean round to 4.55 m to qualify. Holly Bradshaw, Lisa Ryzih, Jennifer Suhr, Eliza McCartney, Yarisley Silva and Martina Strutz already had misses and had to jump 4.60. All but Strutz did it on their first attempt. Ekaterini Stefanidi had passed the lower heights and took her only attempt at 4.60, which was successful to qualify.

In the final, 4.60 proved to be the end of the line as both returning Olympic medalists from 2012, Suhr and Silva topped out. They left tied with one miss each. 2012 bronze medalist Yelena Isinbayeva did not return because Russia's athletics team was suspended from international competition for state-sponsored doping. Isinbayeva later announced her retirement. Six women were able to clear 4.70, McCartney and Stefanidi were tied with the lead, each without a miss. Stefanidi missed her first attempt at 4.80, so when McCartney remained perfect, she took the lead. Stefanidi, Sandi Morris and Alana Boyd all cleared on their second attempt. After missing her first attempt at 4.80, Nicole Büchler saved her two remaining attempts for 4.85 (she missed both). Stefanidi took the lead with a second attempt clearance of 4.85 m (15 ft 10 3/4 in). Morris followed with a clearance of her own. When McCartney and Boyd were unable to clear the bar, Morris was guaranteed silver. Neither were able to clear 4.90 m (16 ft 3/4 in), though on Morris' last attempt, knowing it was all or nothing for the gold medal, it looked like she was well over the bar, her thigh just catching the bar on the way down to dislodge it. 19-year-old McCartney equaled her National Record, set in March 2016.

The medals were presented by Irena Szewińska and Svein Arne Hansen.

== Competition format ==
The competition consisted of two rounds, qualification and final. In qualification, each athlete had three attempts at each height and is eliminated if she failed to clear any height. Athletes who successfully jumped the qualifying height moved on the final. If fewer than 12 reached that height, the best 12 moved on. Cleared heights were reset for the final, which followed the same three-attempts-per-height format until all athletes reach a height they can not jump.

== Schedule ==
All times are Brasilia Time (UTC-3)

Date	Time	Round
Tuesday, 16 August 2016	09:45	Qualifications
Friday, 19 August 2016	20:30	Finals

== Records ==
Prior to the competition, the existing World and Olympic records were as follows.

World record	Yelena Isinbayeva (RUS)	5.06 m	Zürich, Switzerland	28 August 2009
Olympic record	Yelena Isinbayeva (RUS)	5.05 m	Beijing, China	18 August 2008
2016 World leading	Sandi Morris (USA)	4.93 m	Houston, USA	23 July 2016

The following national record was established during the competition:

Country	Athlete	Round	Height	Notes
New Zealand	Eliza McCartney (NZL)	Final	4.80 m	=

== Results ==
Key

- o = Height cleared
- x = Height failed
- – = Height passed
- r = Retired
- SB = Season's best
- PB = Personal best
- NR = National record
- AR = Area record
- OR = Olympic record
- WR = World record
- WL = World lead
- NM = No mark
- DNS = Did not start
- DQ = Disqualified

=== Qualifying round ===
Qualification rule: Qualifying performance 4.60 (Q) or at least 12 best performers (q) advance to the Final.

Rank	Group	Name	Nationality	4.15	4.30	4.45	4.55	4.60	Result	Notes
1	A	Katerina Stefanidi	Greece	–	–	–	–	o	4.60	Q
2	A	Holly Bradshaw	Great Britain	–	–	o	xo	o	4.60	Q
2	A	Lisa Ryzih	Germany	–	–	–	xo	o	4.60	Q
2	B	Jennifer Suhr	United States	–	–	–	xo	o	4.60	Q
5	A	Eliza McCartney	New Zealand	–	–	xxo	xo	o	4.60	Q
5	B	Yarisley Silva	Cuba	–	–	xo	xxo	o	4.60	Q
7	B	Martina Strutz	Germany	–	o	xo	o	xo	4.60	Q
8	A	Kelsie Ahbe	Canada	–	o	o	o	–	4.55	q
8	A	Alana Boyd	Australia	–	–	o	o	–	4.55	q
8	B	Nicole Büchler	Switzerland	–	–	o	o	–	4.55	q
8	A	Sandi Morris	United States	–	–	o	o	–	4.55	q
8	B	Tina Šutej	Slovenia	o	o	o	o	–	4.55	q
13	B	Minna Nikkanen	Finland	–	o	xo	o	xxx	4.55	
14	B	Angelica Bengtsson	Sweden	o	o	o	xo	xxx	4.55	
14	A	Maryna Kylypko	Ukraine	o	o	o	xo	xxx	4.55	
16	B	Li Ling	China	–	o	xo	xo	xxx	4.55	
17	A	Michaela Meijer	Sweden	–	o	o	xxx		4.45	
17	B	Alysha Newman	Canada	–	o	o	xxx		4.45	
19	A	Jiřina Ptáčníková	Czech Republic	–	o	xo	xxx		4.45	
19	A	Lexi Weeks	United States	–	o	xo	xxx		4.45	
21	B	Sonia Malavisi	Italy	o	o	xxo	xxx		4.45	
21	B	Annika Roloff	Germany	–	o	xxo	xxx		4.45	
23	A	Angelica Moser	Switzerland	xo	xxo	xxo	xxx		4.45	
24	B	Romana Maláčová	Czech Republic	o	o	xxx			4.30	
24	A	Wilma Murto	Finland	–	o	xxx			4.30	
24	B	Marta Onofre	Portugal	o	o	xxx			4.30	
27	B	Tori Pena	Ireland	o	xo	xxx			4.30	
28	A	Vanessa Boslak	France	o	xxo	xxx			4.30	
29	A	Joana Costa	Brazil	o	xxx				4.15	
29	B	Annika Newell	Canada	o	xxx				4.15	
29	B	Diamara Planell	Puerto Rico	o	xxx				4.15	
29	A	Femke Pluim	Netherlands	o	xxx				4.15	
29	A	Maria Leonor Tavares	Portugal	o	xxx				4.15	
34	B	Iryna Yakaltsevich	Belarus	xxo	xxx				4.15	
	B	Fabiana Murer	Brazil	–	–	–	xxx		NM	
	A	Ren Mengqian	China	xxx					NM	
	B	Nikoleta Kyriakopoulou	Greece						DNS	
	A	Robeilys Peinado	Venezuela						DNS	

=== Final ===
Rank	Name	Nationality	4.35	4.50	4.60	4.70	4.80	4.85	4.90	Result	Notes
1st place, gold medalist(s)	Katerina Stefanidi	Greece	–	–	o	o	xo	xo	xxx	4.85	
2nd place, silver medalist(s)	Sandi Morris	United States	–	o	o	xo	xo	xo	xxx	4.85	
3rd place, bronze medalist(s)	Eliza McCartney	New Zealand	–	o	o	o	o	xxx		4.80	=NR
4	Alana Boyd	Australia	–	o	o	xxo	xo	xxx		4.80	
5	Holly Bradshaw	Great Britain	–	o	xo	o	xxx			4.70	SB
6	Nicole Büchler	Switzerland	–	o	xxo	o	x–	xx		4.70	
7	Jennifer Suhr	United States	–	–	xo	xxx				4.60	
7	Yarisley Silva	Cuba	–	o	xo	xxx				4.60	
9	Martina Strutz	Germany	o	o	xxo	xxx				4.60	
10	Lisa Ryzih	Germany	–	o	–	xxx				4.50	
11	Tina Šutej	Slovenia	o	xo	xxx					4.50	
12	Kelsie Ahbe	Canada	xxo	xxo	xxx					4.50	
