= Pluim =

Pluim is a surname. Notable people with the surname include:

- Femke Pluim (born 1994), Dutch pole vaulter
- Wiljan Pluim (born 1989), Dutch footballer
