= Dailis Caballero =

Cuban-American athlete

Personal information
- Full name: Daylis Caballero Vega
- Born: March 6, 1988 (age 38) Havana

Sport
- Country: Cuba (1988–2019); United States (since 2019)
- Sport: Athletics
- Event: Pole Vault
Medal record
CAC Championships
Silver medal – second place	2009 Havana	Pole vault
Ibero-American Championships
Gold medal – first place	2012 Barquisimeto	Pole vault
- Updated on June 25, 2013

Dailis Caballero Vega (born March 6, 1988) is a Cuban-born American track and field athlete who competes in the pole vault. She has a personal best of 4.51 m for the event – the second highest by a Cuban woman. She represented Cuba at the 2011 Pan American Games and the 2011 World Championships in Athletics. She has won medals at the Central American and Caribbean Championships and Ibero-American Championships.

She competes for the United States since 2019.

Born in Havana, Caballero began competing in the pole vault as a teenager and cleared four metres for the first time in 2007. She improved to 4.25 m the following year in Havana in June. At the Barrientos Memorial in 2009 she established herself nationally by finishing as runner-up to Yarisley Silva with a best of 4.30 m. The pair repeated that placing at the 2009 Central American and Caribbean Championships in Athletics in Havana, bringing Caballero a silver medal on her international debut.

Her 2010 season was highlighted by a win at the Barrientos Memorial with a personal best-equalling vault. She had a marked improvement at the beginning of 2011, vaulting 4.45 m, then 4.51 m in Havana. She repeated her win at the Barrientos meet in 2011, but she then failed to clear a height at the 2011 CAC Championships. Two major international performances came towards the end of the season: she competed on the global stage for the first time at the 2011 World Championships in Athletics (performing in the qualifiers) and represented Cuba at the 2011 Pan American Games (finishing in seventh place).

Caballero competed on the European indoor circuit at the start of 2012 and set an indoor best of 4.42 m at the XL Galan. Outdoors she cleared 4.40 m in May and headed to Barquisimeto for the 2012 Ibero-American Championships in Athletics the month after to take her first international gold medal with a vault of 4.50 m. She was selected to compete for Cuba at the 2012 Summer Olympics alongside fellow vaulter Yarisley Silva.

Away from the track since 2013, she returned to competitions in 2019 as a United States athlete. She finished 5th at the US Championships with a vault of 4.60 m.

== Personal bests ==
Outdoor

- Pole vault: 4.60 m – (United States) Des Moines, July 28, 2019

Indoor

- Pole vault: 4.50 m – (United States) Lubbock, January 18, 2019

== Competition record ==
Year	Competition	Venue	Position	Notes
Representing Cuba
2009	ALBA Games	La Habana, Cuba	1st	4.00 m
2009	Central American and Caribbean Championships	La Habana, Cuba	2nd	4.10 m
2011	Central American and Caribbean Championships	Mayagüez, Puerto Rico	–	NM
2011	World Championships	Daegu, South Korea	23rd (q)	4.40 m
2011	Pan American Games	Guadalajara, Mexico	7th	4.10 m
2012	Ibero-American Championships	Barquisimeto, Venezuela	1st	4.50 m
2012	Olympic Games	London, England	–	NM
