= Maryna Kylypko =

Ukrainian pole vaulter

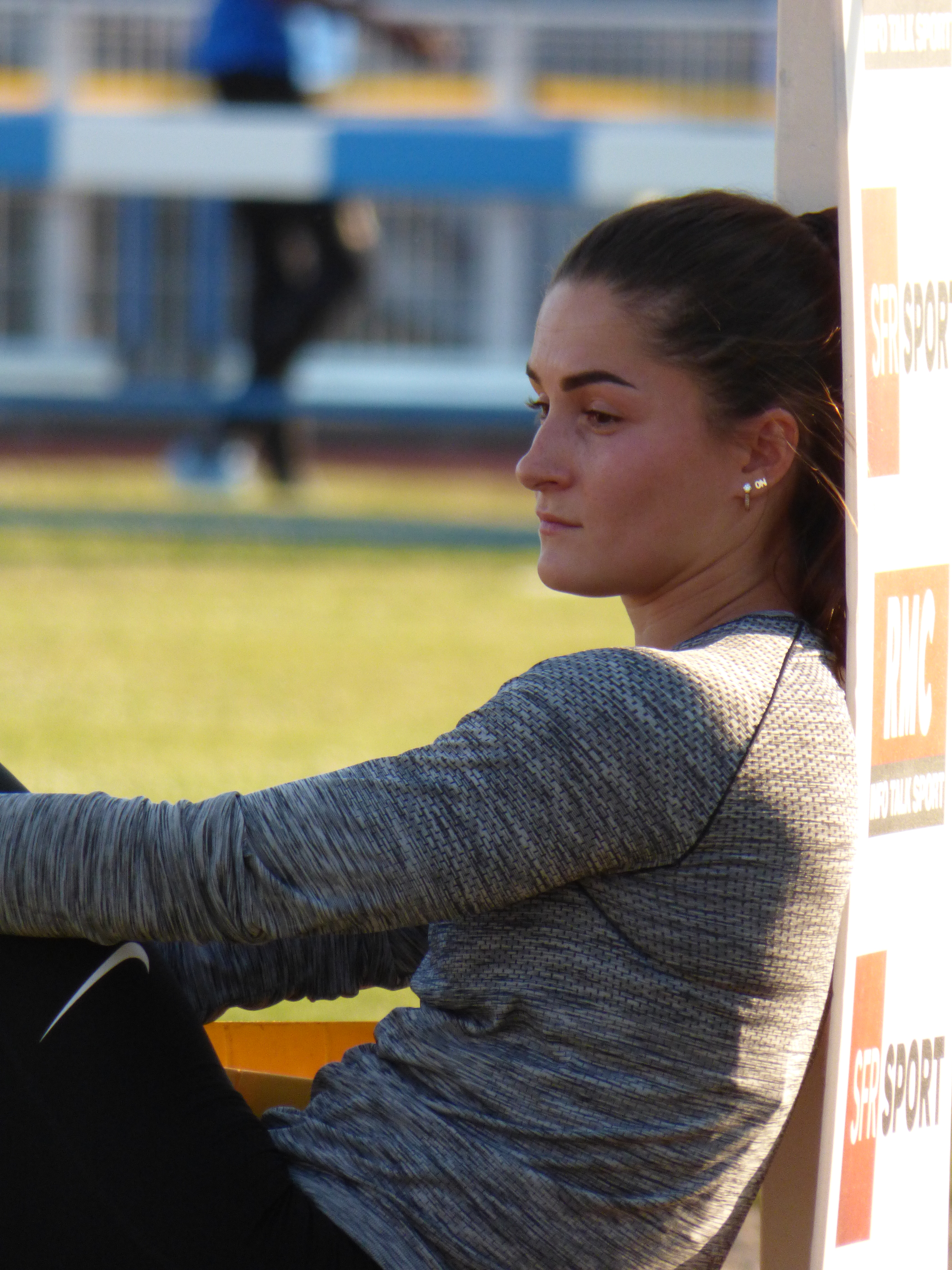
- Kylypko in 2018

Personal information
- Born: 10 November 1995 (age 30) Kharkiv, Ukraine
- Education: Kharkiv State Academy of Physical Culture
- Height: 1.64 m (5 ft 5 in)
- Weight: 58 kg (128 lb)

Sport
- Sport: Athletics
- Event: Pole vault
Medal record
Women's athletics
Representing Ukraine
European Indoor Championships
Bronze medal – third place	2017 Belgrade	Pole vault

Maryna Vyacheslavivna Kylypko (Ukrainian: Марина В'ячеславівна Килипко; born 10 November 1995) is a Ukrainian athlete specialising in the pole vault.

== Career ==
She represented her country at the 2020 Summer Olympics, finishing fifth in the pole vault final.

Her personal bests in the event are 4.65 metres outdoors (Trani, 3 September 2016, national record) and 4.55 metres indoors (Belgrade 2017).

== International competitions ==
Year	Competition	Venue	Position	Notes
Representing Ukraine
2011	World Youth Championships	Lille, France	–	NM
2013	European Junior Championships	Rieti, Italy	23rd (q)	3.65 m
2014	World Junior Championships	Eugene, United States	18th (q)	4.00 m
2015	European U23 Championships	Tallinn, Estonia	16th (q)	4.10 m
2016	European Championships	Amsterdam, Netherlands	17th (q)	4.35 m
2016	Olympic Games	Rio de Janeiro, Brazil	14th (q)	4.55 m
2017	European Indoor Championships	Belgrade, Serbia	3rd	4.55 m
2017	European U23 Championships	Bydgoszcz, Poland	2nd	4.45 m
2017	World Championships	London, United Kingdom	24th (q)	4.20 m
2017	Universiade	Taipei, Taiwan	4th	4.40 m
2018	European Championships	Berlin, Germany	8th	4.45 m
2019	World Championships	Doha, Qatar	21st (q)	4.50 m
2021	European Indoor Championships	Toruń, Poland	9th	4.35 m
2021	Olympic Games	Tokyo, Japan	5th	4.50 m
2022	World Championships	Eugene, United States	16th (q)	4.35 m
2022	European Championships	Munich, Germany	22nd (q)	4.25 m
2025	World Championships	Tokyo, Japan	21st (q)	4.45 m
2026	European Championships	Birmingham, United Kingdom	24th (q)	4.25 m
