= Becky Holliday =

American pole vaulter (born 1980)

Personal information
- Nationality: American
- Born: March 12, 1980 (age 46)
- Height: 5 ft 3 in (1.60 m)

Sport
- Country: United States
- Sport: Track and field athletics
- Event: Pole vault
- University team: Oregon Ducks
- Turned pro: 2003

Achievements and titles
- Personal best(s): outdoor: 4.60 m (15 ft 1 in) indoor: 4.57 m (15 ft 0 in)
Medal record
Women's athletics
Representing the United States
Pan American Games
Bronze medal – third place	Guadalajara 2011	Pole vault
NACAC Championships
Gold medal – first place	San Salvador 2007	Pole vault
USA Outdoor Track and Field Championships
Silver medal – second place	Des Moines 2010	Pole vault
Silver medal – second place	Eugene 2012	Pole vault
Bronze medal – third place	Palo Alto 2003	Pole vault
Bronze medal – third place	Indianapolis 2006	Pole vault
Bronze medal – third place	Des Moines 2013	Pole vault
Bronze medal – third place	Sacramento 2014	Pole vault
USA Indoor Track and Field Championships
Silver medal – second place	Boston 2005	Pole vault
Silver medal – second place	Albuquerque 2011	Pole vault
Bronze medal – third place	Albuquerque 2010	Pole vault
- Updated on June 25, 2012

Becky Holliday (Rebecca Holliday, born March 12, 1980) is an American pole vaulter. She placed 2nd at the 2012 US Olympic trials in Eugene, Oregon with a final clearance of 14-11 (4.55m), qualifying her for the 2012 Summer Olympics where she finished 9th in the finals. In 2003, as a senior competing for the University of Oregon, Holliday placed 1st at the NCAA Outdoor Championships. Her personal record is 4.60m, set in Des Moines, Iowa in 2010.

Holliday began pole vaulting at Reed High School in Sparks, Nevada. Jumping 11' 9" she won the Nevada state title in her second year of vaulting. Previous to taking up the pole vault, she had been a gymnast. Her next stop was at Clackamas Community College just outside Portland, Oregon, where she improved to 14 ft 4 in (4.37 m) to set the still standing Community College record in the event in 2001.

She is a member of the Church of Jesus Christ of Latter-day Saints.
