= Marta Onofre =

Portuguese pole vaulter (born 1991)

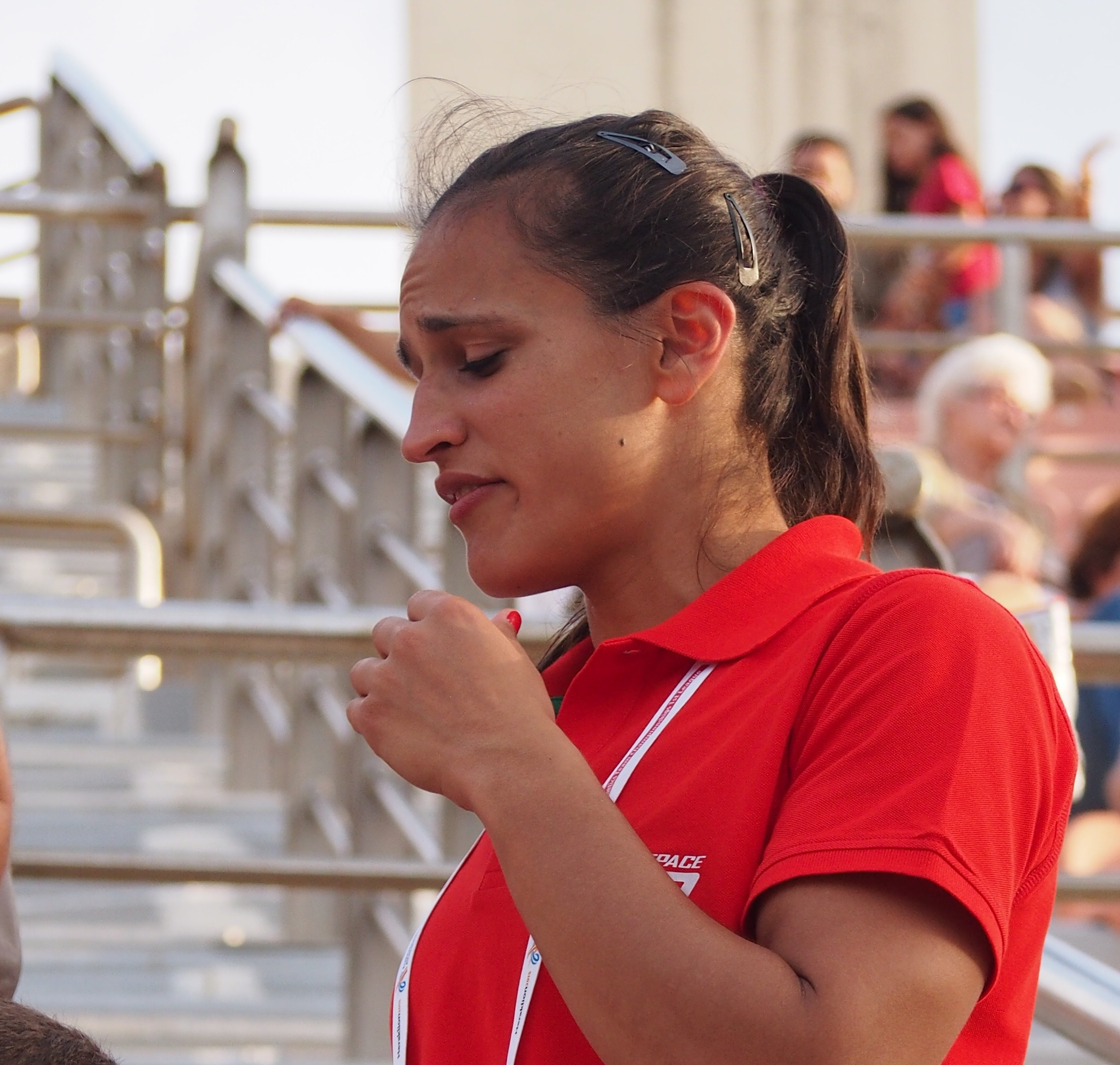
- Onofre in 2015

Personal information
- Born: 28 January 1991 (age 35)
- Education: University of Lisbon; Universidade Lusófona
- Height: 1.71 m (5 ft 7 in)
- Weight: 65 kg (143 lb)

Sport
- Country: Portugal
- Sport: Track and field
- Event: Pole vault
- Club: Sporting Clube de Portugal

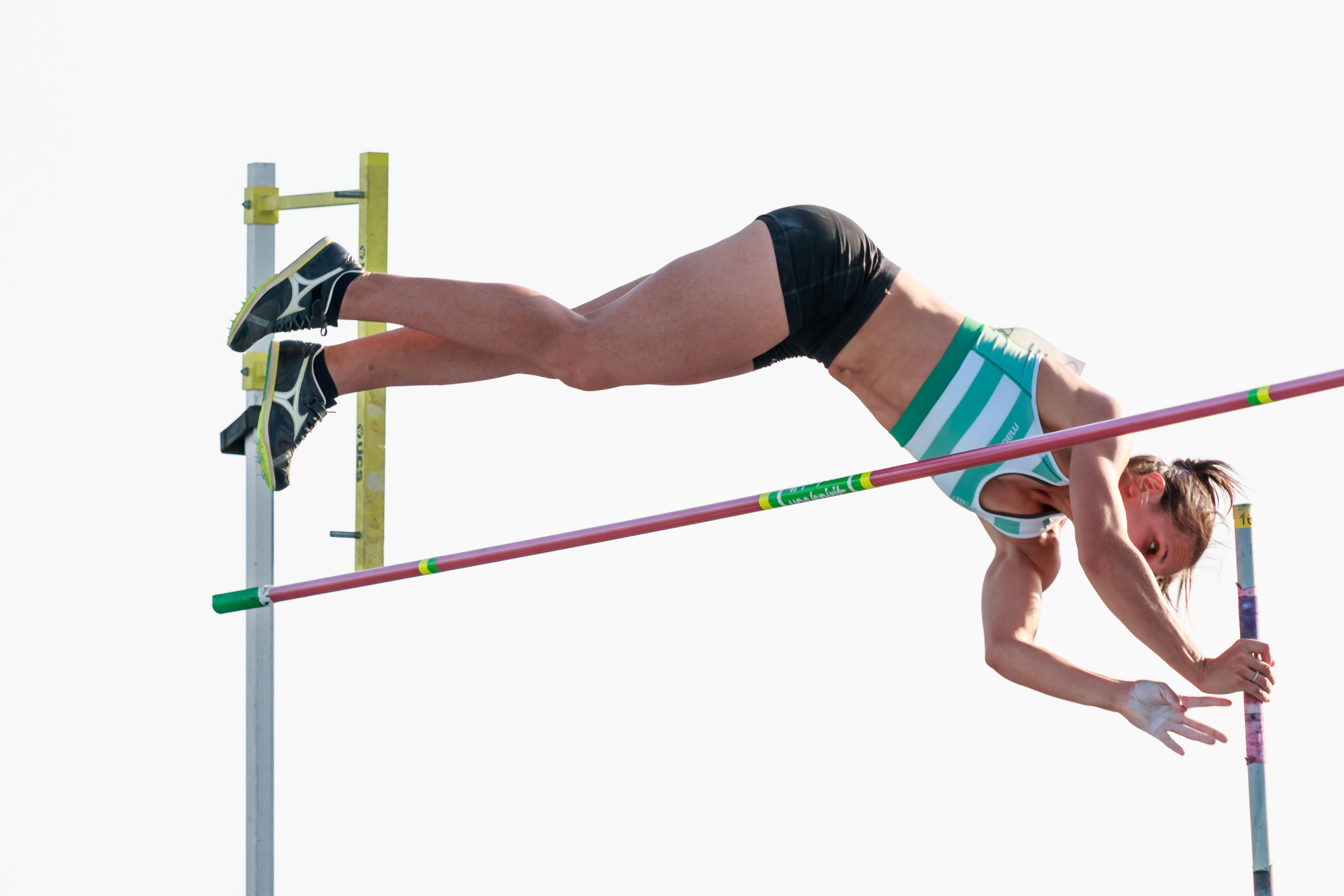
Marta Onofre jumping during the IAAF World Challenge Meeting Madrid 2017.

Marta Onofre (born 28 January 1991) is a Portuguese pole vaulter. She competed at the 2016 IAAF World Indoor Championships. Her personal bests in the event are 4.40 metres outdoors (Taipei 2017) and 4.51 metres indoors (Pombal 2016). The latter is the current national record.

== Competition record ==
Year	Competition	Venue	Position	Notes
Representing Portugal
2007	European Youth Olympic Festival	Belgrade, Serbia	15th	3.20 m
2011	European U23 Championships	Ostrava, Czech Republic	15th (q)	3.95 m
2013	European U23 Championships	Tampere, Finland	13th (q)	4.05 m
2014	European Championships	Zürich, Switzerland	24th (q)	4.15 m
2015	Universiade	Gwangju, South Korea	8th	4.15 m
2016	World Indoor Championships	Portland, United States	–	NM
2016	European Championships	Amsterdam, Netherlands	15th (q)	4.35 m
2016	Olympic Games	Rio de Janeiro, Brazil	24th (q)	4.30 m
2017	Universiade	Taipei, Taiwan	3rd	4.40 m
2018	Mediterranean Games	Tarragona, Spain	7th	4.11 m
