= Kelsie Ahbe =

American-Canadian pole vaulter (born 1991)

Personal information
- Nationality: Canadian-American
- Born: July 6, 1991 (age 35) Akron, Ohio, United States
- Height: 5 ft 7 in (170 cm)
- Weight: 137 lb (62 kg)
- Website: https://olympic.ca/team-canada/kelsie-ahbe/

Sport
- Country: Canada
- Sport: Track and field
- Event: Pole vault
- College team: Indiana University Bloomington
- Team: Nike
- Turned pro: 2015
- Coached by: Jim Bemiller (2019)
- Retired: 2020

Achievements and titles
- Personal best: 4.55 m (14 ft 11 in)
Medal record
Women's track and field
Representing Canada
Olympic Games
	2016 Rio de Janeiro	Pole vault
World Championships
	2017 London	Pole vault
	2019 Doha	Pole vault
2015 Pan American Games
	2015 Toronto	Pole Vault
	2019 Lima	Pole Vault
NACAC Championships
Silver medal – second place	2015 San José	Pole Vault
Representing the United States
World Athletics U20 Championships
	2010 Moncton, Canada	Pole Vault

Kelsie Elizabet Ahbe (born July 6, 1991 in Akron, Ohio) is an American-born Canadian pole vaulter.

Kelsie placed 12th at the 2016 Olympics in Rio, coached by Tim Mack, 2004 Olympic Gold Medalist. Kelsie competed in the 2017 and 2019 World Championships. She was coached by Jim Bemiller in 2019. He coached Tim Mack and Lawrence Johnson, among others. At the 2010 World Junior Championships in Athletics she finished 7th competing for the United States.

Domestically, she won the Canadian national championship in 2015. She took silver at the 2015 NACAC Championships in Athletics and finished 5th at the 2015 Pan American Games.

She has the third best jump in Canadian woman's history.

In July 2016 she was officially named to Canada's Olympic team.

Athletics Canada published a retirement article with Kelsie Ahbe Holahan in January 2021.

Year	Competition	Venue	Position	Event	Notes
Representing Canada
2019	World Championships	Doha, Qatar	22nd	Pole vault	4.35 m (14 ft 3 in)
2019	Pan American Games	Lima, Peru	6th	Pole vault	4.35 m (14 ft 3 in)
2017	World Championships	London, United Kingdom	25th	Pole Vault	NH @ 4.20 m (13 ft 9 in)
2016	Olympic Games	Rio de Janeiro, Brazil	12th	Pole Vault	4.50 m (14 ft 9 in)
2015	North American, Central American and Caribbean Championships	San José, Costa Rica	2nd	Pole Vault	4.40 m (14 ft 5 in)
2015	Pan American Games	Toronto, Canada	5th	Pole Vault	4.40 m (14 ft 5 in)
Representing United States
2010	2010 World Junior Championships in Athletics	Moncton, New Brunswick, Canada	7th	Pole Vault	3.95 m (13 ft 0 in)
Canadian Track and Field Championships
2019	Canadian Track and Field Championships	Montréal	2nd	Pole vault	4.36 m (14 ft 4 in)
2017	Canadian Track and Field Championships	Ottawa, Canada	3rd	Pole vault	4.45 m (14 ft 7 in)
2016	Canadian Olympic Trials	Edmonton, Canada	3rd	Pole vault	4.35 m (14 ft 3 in)
2015	Canadian Track and Field Championships	Edmonton, Canada	1st	Pole vault	4.30 m (14 ft 1 in)
USA Junior Outdoor Track & Field Championships
2010	USATF U20 Outdoor Championships	Des Moines, Iowa	2nd	Pole vault	4.05 m (13 ft 3 in)
