= Anicka Newell =

Canadian pole vaulter (born 1993)

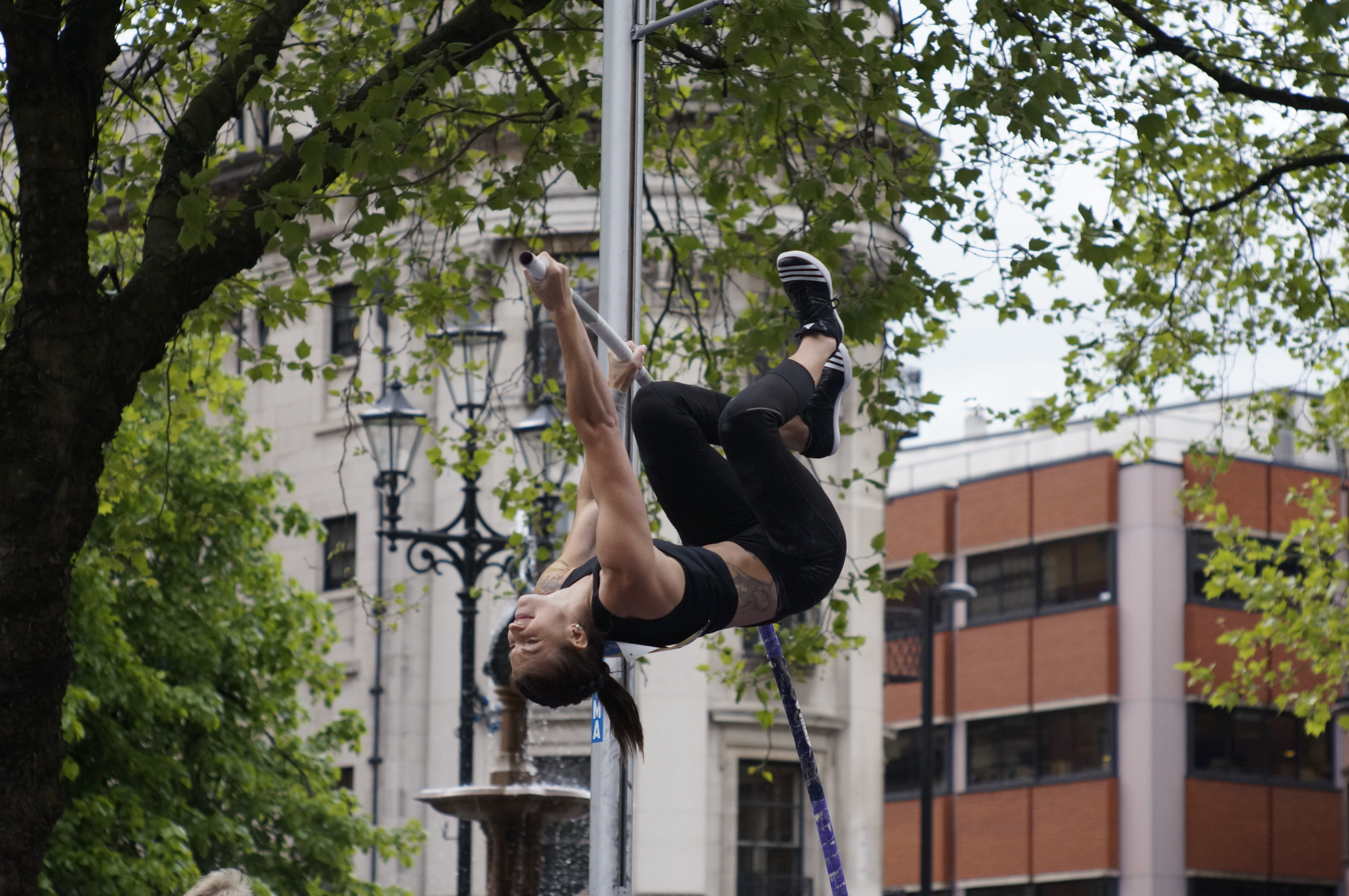
- Newell at the 2016 Great City Games

Personal information
- Born: August 5, 1993 (age 32) Denton, Texas, U.S.
- Height: 1.75 m (5 ft 9 in)
- Weight: 64 kg (141 lb)

Sport
- Country: Canada
- Sport: Athletics
- Event: Pole vault
- Coached by: Keith Herston

Achievements and titles
- Personal best: 4.70 m (2021)

Anicka Newell (born August 5, 1993 in Denton, Texas) is a Canadian pole vaulter.

== Professional ==
Newell placed 1st at the 2018 Canadian Athletics Championships in Ottawa and cleared 4.45 m (14 ft 7 in) to qualify for the August 11, 2018 NACAC Championships in Toronto, but did not clear a height.

Newell placed 7th in the 2018 Commonwealth Games, clearing 4.30 m (14 ft 1 in).

Anicka Newell placed 12th in women's pole vault at the 2017 World Championships, clearing 4.45 m (14 ft 7 in) on her second attempt.

Newell cleared 4.65 m (15 ft 3 in) at Texas State University San Marcos in June 2017, which is the second best all-time in Athletics Canada history, behind Alysha Newman.

In July 2016, she was officially named to Canada's Olympic team. She is eligible to compete for Canada as her mother was born in the country. Newell placed 29th at the 2016 Olympics, clearing 4.15 m (13 ft 7 in). She also competed at the 2020 Olympics, tying for first in the qualification round, clearing 4.55 m (14 ft 11 in), but receiving no mark in the finals. Newell competed in the 2024 Olympics, clearing 4.40 m (14 ft 5 in) in the qualification round, but did not advance to the finals.

Her personal bests are:

2021	4.70 m (15 ft 5 in)
2020	4.56 m (15 ft 0 in)
2019	4.46 m (14 ft 8 in)
2018	4.60 m (15 ft 1 in)
2017	4.65 m (15 ft 3 in)
2016	4.50 m (14 ft 9 in)
2015	4.28 m (14 ft 1 in)
2014	3.97 m (13 ft 0 in)
2013	3.75 m (12 ft 4 in)
2012	3.65 m (12 ft 0 in)
2011	3.25 m (10 ft 8 in)
2010	3.66 m (12 ft 0 in)
2009	2.98 m (9 ft 9 in)

== NCAA ==
Anicka Newell earned an honorable mention All-America award in the pole vault at 2015 NCAA Division I Outdoor Track and Field Championships. Anicka Newell is a two-time Sun Belt Conference Outdoor track and field champion in pole vault for Texas State Bobcats.

Year	Conference indoor Track and Field Championships	NCAA indoor Track and Field Championships	Conference Outdoor Track and Field Championships	NCAA Outdoor Track and Field Championships
2015 Sun Belt Conference	3.72 m (12 ft 2 in) 3rd	-	4.28 m (14 ft 1 in) 1st	4.05 m (13 ft 3 in) 15th
2014 Sun Belt Conference	3.78 m (12 ft 5 in) 2nd	-	3.94 m (12 ft 11 in) 1st	3.74 m (12 ft 3 in) 84th
2013 Western Athletic Conference	3.72 m (12 ft 2 in) 2nd	-	3.71 m (12 ft 2 in) 2nd	-
2012 Southland Conference	3.40 m (11 ft 2 in) 9th	-	3.55 m (11 ft 8 in) 10th	-

== High school ==
Anicka Newell won a New Mexico Activities Association state individual title in the pole vault for Highland High School (Albuquerque, New Mexico) in 2009.

Year	New Mexico Activities Association AAAAA Outdoor Track and Field Championships
2011	
2010	
2009	2.98 m (9 ft 9 in) 1st
