= Athletics at the 2015 Pan American Games – Women's pole vault =

Women's pole vault at the 2015 Pan American Games
- Venue: CIBC Pan Am and Parapan Am Athletics Stadium
- Dates: July 23
- Competitors: 10 from 7 nations
- Winning height: 4.85

Medalists
Gold medal	Yarisley Silva	Cuba
Silver medal	Fabiana Murer	Brazil
Bronze medal	Jenn Suhr	United States

The women's pole vault competition of the athletics events at the 2015 Pan American Games took place on July 23 at the CIBC Pan Am and Parapan Am Athletics Stadium. The defending Pan American Games champion is Yarisley Silva of Cuba.

== Records ==
Prior to this competition, the existing world and Pan American Games records were as follows:

World record	Elena Isinbaeva (RUS)	5.06	Zürich, Switzerland	August 28, 2009
Pan American Games record	Yarisley Silva (CUB)	4.75	Guadalajara, Mexico	October 24, 2011

== Qualification ==
Each National Olympic Committee (NOC) was able to enter up to two entrants providing they had met the minimum standard (3.68) in the qualifying period (January 1, 2014 to June 28, 2015).

== Schedule ==
Date	Time	Round
July 23, 2015	17:55	Final

== Results ==
All results shown are in meters.

KEY:	q	Best non-qualifiers	Q	Qualified	NR	National record	PB	Personal best	SB	Seasonal best	DQ	Disqualified

=== Final ===
Rank	Name	Nationality	4.00	4.15	4.30	4.40	4.50	4.60	4.65	4.70	4.75	4.80	4.85	4.91	Mark	Notes
1st place, gold medalist(s)	Yarisley Silva	Cuba	-	-	-	-	o	o	-	o	xo	o	xxo	x-	4.85	WL, PR
2nd place, silver medalist(s)	Fabiana Murer	Brazil	-	-	-	-	o	o	-	o	xx-	o	xxx		4.80	=SB
3rd place, bronze medalist(s)	Jenn Suhr	United States	-	-	-	-	xo	o	xxx						4.60	
4	Demi Payne	United States	-	-	-	o	o	x-	xx						4.50	
5	Kelsie Ahbe	Canada	-	o	o	o	xxx								4.40	
6	Robeilys Peinado	Venezuela	o	xo	xxo	xo	xxx								4.40	
7	Mélanie Blouin	Canada	-	o	xxx										4.15	
7	Karla Rosa da Silva	Brazil	o	o	xxx										4.15	
9	Valeria Chiaraviglio	Argentina	o	xo	xxx										4.15	SB
10	Diamara Planell	Puerto Rico	xo	xo	xxx										4.15	
