= Iryna Zhuk =

Belarusian pole vaulter

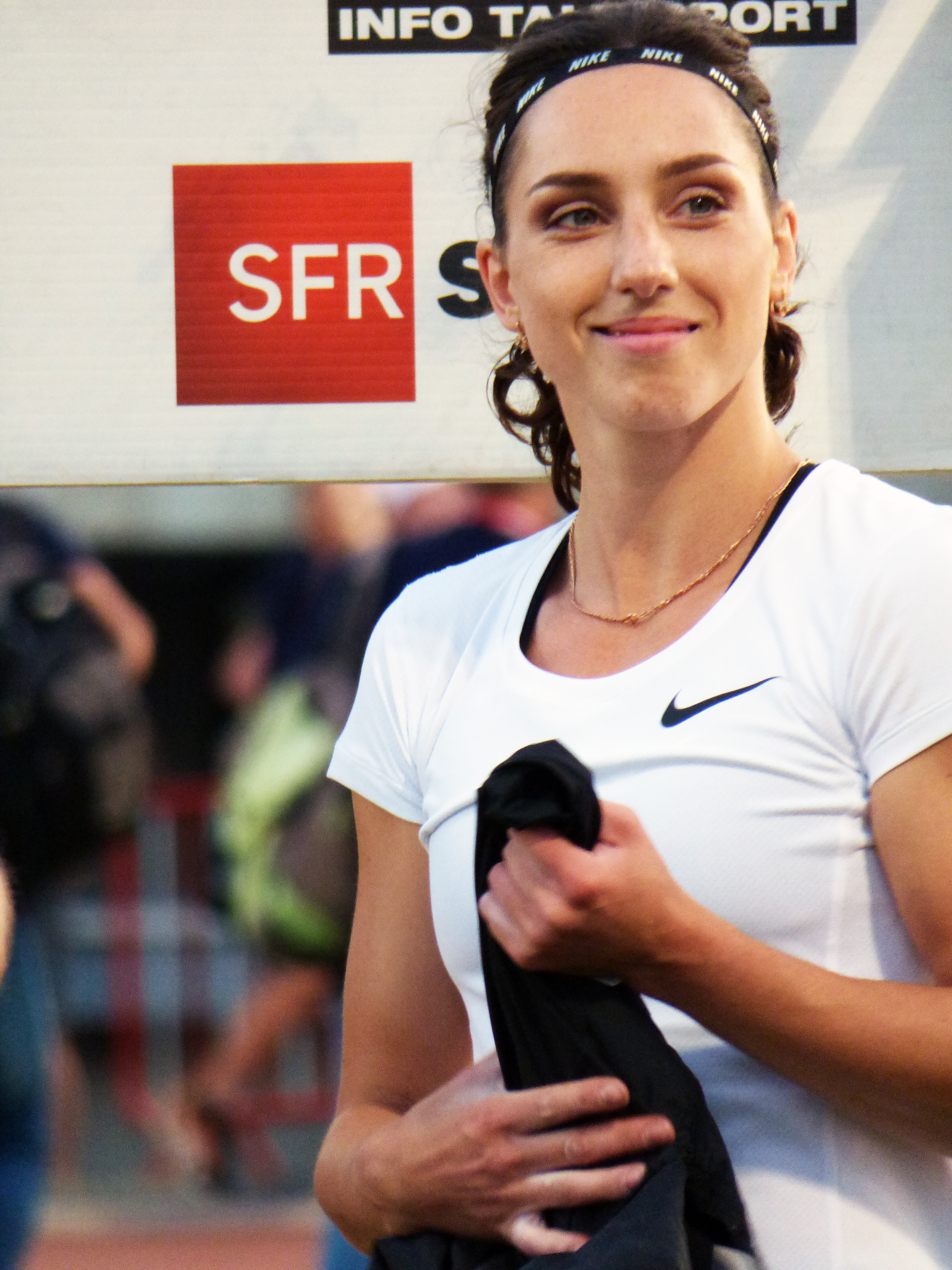
- Zhuk in 2018

Personal information
- Born: Iryna Yakaltsevich; 26 January 1993 (age 33) Grodno, Belarus
- Education: Hrodna State University
- Height: 1.66 m (5 ft 5 in)
- Weight: 57 kg (126 lb)

Sport
- Sport: Athletics
- Event: Pole vault
Medal record
Women's athletics
Representing Belarus
European Indoor Championships
Bronze medal – third place	2021 Toruń	Pole vault
Universiade
Gold medal – first place	2017 Taipei	Pole vault

Iryna Henadzeuna Zhuk, née Yakaltsevich (Belarusian: Ірына Генадзеўна Жук (Якалцэвіч); born 26 January 1993), is a Belarusian athlete specialising in the pole vault. She represented her country at the 2016 Summer Olympics without qualifying for the final. She won the gold medal at the 2017 Summer Universiade. In 2021, Zhuk tied for third at the European Athletics Indoor Championships with Holly Bradshaw. Zhuk competed at the 2020 Summer Olympics, this time reaching the final.

Zhuk's personal bests in the event are 4.74 metres outdoors (2021) and 4.80 metres indoors (2022). Both marks are also national records.

She is married to Belarusian athlete Vital Zhuk.

== International competitions ==
Year	Competition	Venue	Position	Notes
Representing Belarus
2010	Youth Olympic Games	Bishan, Singapore	2nd (B)	3.90 m
2012	World Junior Championships	Barcelona, Spain	16th (q)	3.95 m
2015	European U23 Championships	Tallinn, Estonia	4th	4.25 m
2016	European Championships	Amsterdam, Netherlands	12th	4.35 m
2016	Olympic Games	Rio de Janeiro, Brazil	34th (q)	4.15 m
2017	European Indoor Championships	Belgrade, Serbia	12th	4.40 m
2017	World Championships	London, United Kingdom	–	NM
2017	Universiade	Taipei, Taiwan	1st	4.40 m
2018	European Championships	Berlin, Germany	7th	4.55 m
2019	European Indoor Championships	Glasgow, United Kingdom	6th	4.65 m
2019	World Championships	Doha, Qatar	7th	4.70 m
2021	European Indoor Championships	Toruń, Poland	3rd	4.65 m
2021	Olympic Games	Tokyo, Japan	8th	4.50 m
