= Valeria Chiaraviglio =

Argentine pole vaulter

Personal information
- Born: 9 April 1989 (age 36) Santa Fe, Argentina
- Education: Instituto Universitario del Gran Rosario
- Height: 1.78 m (5 ft 10 in)
- Weight: 62 kg (137 lb)

Sport
- Sport: Athletics
- Event: Pole vault
- Coached by: Guillermo Chiaraviglio

Valeria Chiaraviglio Ermácora (born 9 April 1989) is an Argentine athlete specialising in the pole vault.

She is the younger sister of another pole vaulter, Germán Chiaraviglio. Her personal best in the event is 4.20 metres set in Santa Fe in 2011.

== International competitions ==
Year	Competition	Venue	Position	Notes
Representing Argentina
2004	South American Youth Championships	Guayaquil, Ecuador	2nd	3.60 m
2005	World Youth Championships	Marrakesh, Morocco	18th (q)	3.65 m
2006	South American Youth Championships	Caracas, Venezuela	1st	3.45 m
2006	South American Games	Buenos Aires, Argentina	5th	3.60 m
2007	South American Junior Championships	São Paulo, Brazil	5th	3.50 m
2007	Pan American Junior Championships	São Paulo, Brazil	9th	3.40 m
2008	South American U23 Championships	Lima, Peru	2nd	3.50 m
2010	South American Games	Medellín, Colombia	–	NM
2012	Ibero-American Championships	Barquisimeto, Venezuela	5th	4.00 m
2013	South American Championships	Cartagena, Colombia	2nd	4.15 m
2014	South American Games	Santiago, Chile	4th	4.00 m
2014	Ibero-American Championships	São Paulo, Brazil	3rd	4.10 m
2014	Pan American Sports Festival	Mexico City, Mexico	1st	4.00 m
2015	South American Championships	Lima, Peru	2nd	4.10 m
2015	Pan American Games	Toronto, Canada	9th	4.15 m
2016	Ibero-American Championships	Rio de Janeiro, Brazil	3rd	4.10 m
2017	South American Championships	Asunción, Paraguay	3rd	4.15 m
2017	Universiade	Taipei, Taiwan	8th	4.10 m
2018	South American Games	Cochabamba, Bolivia	4th	3.70 m
2021	South American Championships	Guayaquil, Ecuador	4th	3.90 m
