= 2005 USA Indoor Track and Field Championships =

- Dates: February 25–27
- Host city: Boston, Massachusetts, United States
- Venue: Reggie Lewis Track and Athletic Center
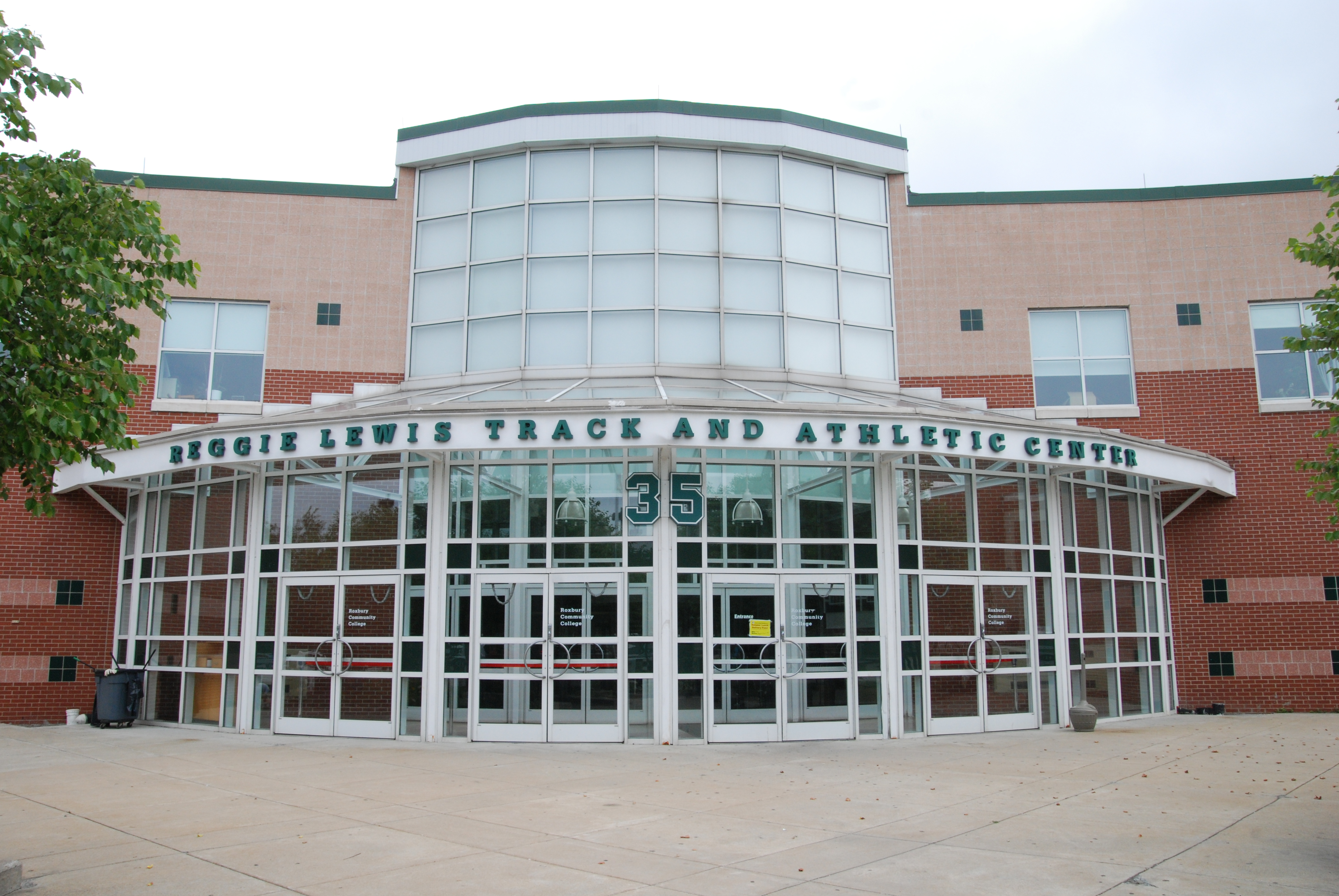
- Level: Senior
- Type: Indoor
- Events: 31 (16 men's + 15 women's)

The 2005 USA Indoor Track and Field Championships were held at the Reggie Lewis Track and Athletic Center in Boston, Massachusetts. Organized by USA Track and Field (USATF), the two-day competition took place February 25–27 and served as the national championships in indoor track and field for the United States. The championships in combined track and field events were held at a different time.

At the meeting, Erin Gilreath threw what would have been a world best in the women's weight throw, but the mark was not eligible for records because of an implement specification violation. The throwing implement was measured to be the proper length before the competition, but after the record was set it was re-measured and found to be too long.

== Medal summary ==
=== Men ===
| Event | Gold | | Silver | Bronze |
|---|---|---|---|---|
| 60 m | Mardy Scales | 6.61 | | |
| 400 m | Bershawn Jackson | 46.05 | | |
| 800 m | Kevin Hicks | 1:48.73 | | |
| 1500 m | Scott McGowan | 3:44.06 | | |
| 3000 m | Jonathon Riley | 7:53.73 | | |
| 60 m hurdles | Joel Brown | 7.60 | | |
| High jump | Tora Harris | 2.27 m | | |
| Pole vault | Brad Walker | 5.65 m | | |
| Long jump | Brian Johnson | 7.89 m | | |
| Triple jump | Walter Davis | 17.31 m | | |
| Shot put | John Godina | 21.83 m | | |
| Weight throw | A.G. Kruger | 23.47 m | | |
| Heptathlon | Ryan Harlan | 6102 pts | | |
| 1 mile walk | Tim Seaman | 6:00.76 | | |
| 3000 m walk | Tim Seaman | 11:57.89 | | |
| 5000 m walk | Tim Seaman | 19:56.41 | | |

=== Women ===
| Event | Gold | | Silver | Bronze |
|---|---|---|---|---|
| 60 m | Angela Daigle | 7.09 | | |
| 400 m | Dee Dee Trotter | 52.01 | | |
| 800 m | Hazel Clark | 2:01.98 | | |
| 1500 m | Jennifer Toomey | 4:13.25 | | |
| 3000 m | Shayne Culpepper | 8:55.57 | | |
| 60 m hurdles | Danielle Carruthers | 7.95 | | |
| High jump | Gwen Wentland | 1.88 m | | |
| Pole vault | Jennifer Stuczynski | 4.35 m | Becky Holliday | |
| Long jump | Rose Richmond | 6.44 m | | |
| Triple jump | Shani Marks | 13.65 m | | |
| Shot put | Jillian Camarena | 17.31 m | | |
| Weight throw | Erin Gilreath | 24.46* m | | |
| Pentathlon | Hyleas Fountain | 4417 pts | | |
| 1 mile walk | Jolene Moore | 6:51.19 | | |
| 3000 m walk | Amber Antonia | 12:55.69 | | |
