= Andrina Hodel =

Swiss pole vaulter

Personal information
- Nationality: Swiss
- Born: 2 June 2000 (age 26)

Sport
- Sport: Athletics
- Event: Pole vault

Andrina Hodel (born 2 June 2000) is a Swiss athlete. She competed in the women's pole vault event at the 2020 Summer Olympics.
