= 2016 IAAF World Indoor Championships – Women's pole vault =

Women's pole vault at the 2016 IAAF World Indoor Championships
- Venue: Oregon Convention Center
- Dates: March 17
- Competitors: 9 from 7 nations
- Winning height: 4.90

Medalists
gold medal	Jenn Suhr	United States
silver medal	Sandi Morris	United States
bronze medal	Katerina Stefanidi	Greece

The women's pole vault at the 2016 IAAF World Indoor Championships took place on March 17, 2016. Jennifer Suhr of the United States won gold.

The men's and women's pole vault competition were the only events on the opening day. They were conducted simultaneously with two parallel runways down the center of the arena. The women's entrants included eight of the top 20 vaulters in history, most of them peaking in the weeks before the competition. One day after her 35th birthday, Fabiana Murer improved upon the listed Masters W35 world record by clearing 4.60. At 4.70, Eliza McCartney set her indoor New Zealand National Record, but barely a footnote considering she had cleared 4.80 at her outdoor national championships just 12 days earlier. She passed her next jump to that same 4.80 mark. At 4.75, the world record holder (improved earlier this season) Jenn Suhr took only her second attempt of the competition to tie for the lead with Ekaterini Stefanidi, who had jumped clean at five heights. Nicole Büchler missed twice at 4.75 and took her final attempt at 4.80 for a Swiss National Record. Sandi Morris and Stefanidi also cleared 4.80 on their first attempts while Suhr passed. At 4.85, Stefanidi and Büchler both failed their first attempts, while Morris and Suhr were successful. Stefanidi and Büchler took their remaining attempts at 4.90 but failed. Suhr cleared 4.90 on her first attempt while Morris failed on her first two attempts and passed to 4.95 which she also missed. Assured of the gold medal Suhr did not take any further attempts. Morris took the silver and Stefanidi won the bronze on countback.

== Records ==
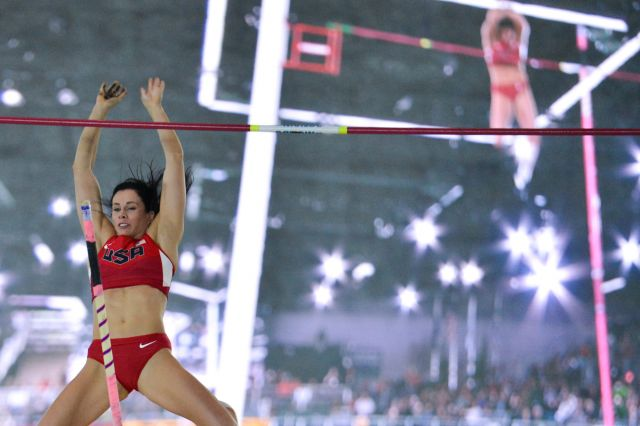
Gold medal winner, Jennifer Suhr

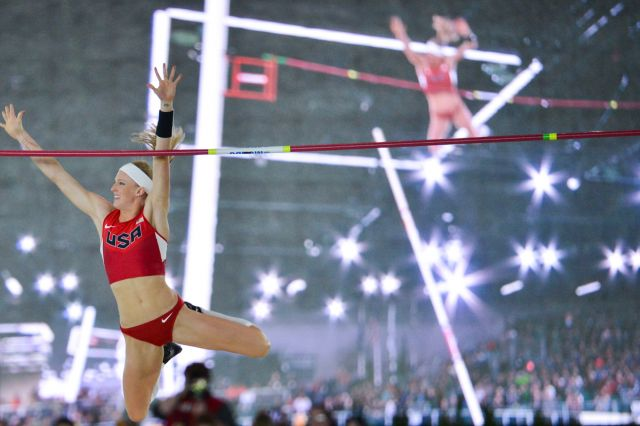
Runner-up, Sandi Morris

Standing records prior to the 2016 IAAF World Indoor Championships
World record	Jennifer Suhr (USA)	5.02	Albuquerque, New Mexico, United States	2 March 2013
Championship record	Elena Isinbaeva (RUS)	4.86	Budapest, Hungary	6 March 2004
World Leading	Jennifer Suhr (USA)	5.03	Brockport, New York, United States	30 January 2016
African record	Elmarie Gerryts (RSA)	4.41	Birmingham, Great Britain	20 February 2000
Asian record	Li Ling (CHN)	4.70	Doha, Qatar	19 February 2016
European record	Elena Isinbaeva (RUS)	5.01	Stockholm, Sweden	23 February 2012
North and Central American and Caribbean record	Jennifer Suhr (USA)	5.02	Albuquerque, New Mexico, United States	2 March 2013
Oceanian Record	Kym Howe (AUS)	4.72	Donetsk, Ukraine	10 February 2007
South American record	Fabiana Murer (BRA)	4.83	Nevers, France	7 February 2015

== Qualification standards ==
Indoor	Outdoor
4.71

== Schedule ==
Date	Time	Round
17 March 2016	19:05	Final

== Results ==
The final was started at 19:05.

Rank	Name	Nationality	4.35	4.50	4.60	4.70	4.75	4.80	4.85	4.90	4.95	Result	Notes
1st place, gold medalist(s)	Jennifer Suhr	United States	–	–	o	–	o	–	o	o		4.90	CR
2nd place, silver medalist(s)	Sandi Morris	United States	–	o	o	o	xo	o	o	xx–	x	4.85	
3rd place, bronze medalist(s)	Katerina Stefanidi	Greece	–	o	o	o	o	o	x–	xx		4.80	
4	Nicole Büchler	Switzerland	–	o	xxo	xxo	xx-	o	x–	xx		4.80	NR
5	Eliza McCartney	New Zealand	–	o	–	xo	–	xxx				4.70	NR
6	Fabiana Murer	Brazil	–	o	o	xxx						4.60	
6	Nikoleta Kyriakopoulou	Greece	–	o	o	xxx						4.60	
8	Romana Maláčová	Czech Republic	xo	o	xxx							4.50	
NM	Marta Onofre	Portugal	xxx									NM	
DNS	Alana Boyd	Australia										DNS	
