= Angela Metzger =

German-born concert organist

Angela Metzger is a German-born concert organist.

== Biography ==
Angela Metzger completed her education by studying church music with an A-diploma and organ with a diploma, master's degree and Artist Diploma with Edgar Krapp and Bernhard Haas at the University of Music and Performing Arts Munich. She also studied oboe at the Tiroler Landeskonservatorium Innsbruck with Konrad Zeller. During her studies, she received a scholarship in the music promotion programme of the Cusanuswerk, the Deutschlandstipendium scholarship and was an artist with Yehudi Menuhin Live Music Now.

She devotes herself to the entire range of organ music, gaining recognition on both historical and modern instruments. She has been invited to perform at the Altenburg Music Festival. the Varaždin Baroque Evenings, the "Night of Contemporary Organ Music" in Berlin, the "orgel-mixturen" in the Kunst-Station Sankt Peter Köln, "BRANDNEU" Kassel, A*Devantgarde Festival in Munich and Musica viva (Bayerischer Rundfunk). She has worked with contemporary composers such as Mark Andre, Moritz Eggert, Betsy Jolas, Philipp Maintz, Johannes X. Schachtner, Dominik Susteck and Francesco Filidei.

Angela Metzger has performed at international organ festivals such as "Fugato" Bad Homburg, the Bergen Organ Summer, the "Celebrity Organ Recitals" in Edinburgh, the Festival ION Nuremberg and "Toulouse les Orgues". 2024 she performed at Quincena Musical San Sebastián and 2025 at Festival Milano Musica in Milan/Italy. She has also performed in Egypt and Israel, and in concert halls such as the Konzerthaus Berlin, the Gewandhaus Leipzig, Philharmonie Essen, the Historische Stadthalle Wuppertal, the Musashino Civic Cultural Hall in Tokyo and the Royal Opera House Muscat (Oman). She was a guest on tour with the Gürzenich Orchestra Cologne under the baton of François-Xavier Roth at the Kölner Philharmonie and the Elbphilharmonie Hamburg. Angela Metzger has also performed as a soloist with the Augsburg Philharmonic, with Essener Philharmoniker, with the WDR Symphony Orchestra Cologne in the series "Musik der Zeit" conducted by Titus Engel and with the Helsinki Philharmonic Orchestra

Her concert career is documented by radio and television recordings as well as CD productions with solo and chamber music works. Her solo CD "Raumgestalten", recorded on the organs for contemporary music at the Kunst-Station Sankt Peter Köln, was nominated for the German Record Critics' Award 2020 and praised by the specialist press as a reference recording. In June 2022 she presented her solo album "Circuli" on Organum Classics. In 2025, NEOS Music released ‘Betsy Jolas: Works for Organ’, which was honoured in the German Record Critics’ Award 4/2025, featuring in the top lists for the categories Keyboard Instruments II and Contemporary Music. In the same year, the album ‘Counterlight’ was released, recorded in the Basilica of St Constantine in Trier.

In addition to her concert activities, Angela Metzger is involved in teaching. During the winter semester 2017/18 she taught as a substitute for Bernhard Haas at the University of Music and Performing Arts Munich, since the winter semester 2023/24, she has been teaching organ literature at the Hochschule für evangelische Kirchenmusik Bayreuth. She gave master classes at the Leeds International Organ Festival in cooperation with the University of Huddersfield and at the 1st Junior Academy Organ Altenburg on historical instruments. She received awards at the international organ competitions in Bad Homburg, Tokyo,Wiesbaden and Wuppertal as well as at the ARD competition in Munich. In addition, she was honoured with the Bayernwerk-Kulturpreis for her outstanding achievements in music, the City of Munich Music Promotion Prize, and the Bayerischer Kunstförderpreis (Bavarian Arts Promotion Prize of the Bavarian State Ministry of Science and the Arts)

In the laudatory speech of the Bayerischer Kunstförderpreis, Angela Metzger was praised as an exceptional young artist who had mastered the organ like hardly anyone else of her generation. "She is characterised not only by an outstanding playing technique as well as high interpretative intelligence, but also by her devoted commitment to the contemporary repertoire." She works with composers on world premieres, presents works and concerts with moderation and is a guest at national and international organ festivals.

== Discography ==
- 2025: Counterlight organ solo. publisher: Rondeau Production
- 2025: Betsy Jolas: Works for Organ. Organ Solo, Organ and Orchestra. publisher: Neos.* 2022: Circuli. organ solo. Organum Classics.
- 2022: Kyklos. organ solo. Schott Music.
- 2020: Raumgestalten. organ solo. publisher: ARE-Verlag.
- 2018: Markus Lehmann-Horn: Die Sterne des Himmels fielen auf die Erde… (2012) for organ solo. In: solo works. solo musica, Munich.
- 2018: Laudazioni alla Vergine Maria. Soprano and organ. publisher: Rondeau Production.

== Awards and recognition ==
- 2025: Förderpreis Musik der Landeshauptstadt München, Munich
- 2019: Bayerischer Kunstförderpreis des Bayerisches Staatsministerium für Wissenschaft und Kunst|Bayerischen Staatsministeriums für Wissenschaft und Kunst
- 2015: Kulturpreis der Bayernwerk AG
- 2015: Internationaler Orgelwettbewerb Wuppertal
- 2014: Internationaler Orgel-Interpretationswettbewerb um den Bachpreis der Landeshauptstadt Wiesbaden
- 2013: Concours International pour Orgue Saint-Maurice
- 2012: Seventh International Organ Competition Musashino, Japan
- 2011: ARD competition, Munich
- 2010: FUGATO-Orgelwettbewerb Bad Homburg
