= Femke Pluim =

Dutch pole vaulter

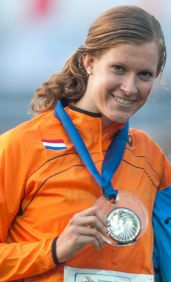
- Femke Pluim in 2013.

Personal information
- Born: 10 May 1994 (age 32) Gouda, Netherlands
- Height: 1.80 m (5 ft 11 in)

Sport
- Sport: Track and field
- Event: Pole vault
- Club: AAV'36
- Coached by: Alex van Zutphen, Robbert-Jan Jansen

Femke Pluim (pronounced [ˈfɛmkə ˈplœym]; born 10 May 1994) is a retired Dutch athlete whose specialty is pole vaulting. She competed at the 2015 World Championships in Athletics in Beijing, without qualifying for the final. In addition she won the silver medal at the 2013 European Junior Championships.

Pluim started off as a gymnast before turning to athletics in 2011, first doing the sprints and only later the pole vault. Her personal bests in the event are 4.55 metres outdoors (Amsterdam 2015) and 4.47 metres indoors (Apeldoorn 2015).

== Competition record ==
Year	Competition	Venue	Position	Notes
Representing the Netherlands
2013	European Junior Championships	Rieti, Italy	2nd	4.25 m
2015	European Indoor Championships	Prague, Czech Republic	16th (q)	4.30 m
2015	European U23 Championships	Tallinn, Estonia	4th	4.25 m
2015	World Championships	Beijing, China	21st (q)	4.30 m
2016	European Championships	Amsterdam, Netherlands	6th	4.45 m
2016	Olympic Games	Rio de Janeiro, Brazil	29th (q)	4.15 m
2018	European Championships	Berlin, Germany	25th (q)	4.20 m
