= Athletics at the 2011 Pan American Games – Women's pole vault =

Women's pole vault at the 2011 Pan American Games
- Venue: Telmex Athletics Stadium
- Dates: October 24
- Competitors: 16 from 11 nations

Medalists
Gold medal	Yarisley Silva	Cuba
Silver medal	Fabiana Murer	Brazil
Bronze medal	Becky Holliday	United States

The women's pole vault competition of the athletics events at the 2011 Pan American Games took place on the 24 of October at the Telmex Athletics Stadium. The defending Pan American Games champion is Fabiana Murer of Brazil.

== Records ==
Prior to this competition, the existing world and Pan American Games records were as follows:

World record	Yelena Isinbayeva (RUS)	5.06	Zürich, Switzerland	August 28, 2009
Pan American Games record	Fabiana Murer (BRA)	4.60	Rio de Janeiro, Brazil	July 23, 2007

== Qualification ==
Each National Olympic Committee (NOC) was able to enter up to two entrants providing they had met the minimum standard (3.50 meters) in the qualifying period (January 1, 2010 to September 14, 2011).

== Schedule ==
Only a final was held. There was no qualification round.

Date	Time	Round
October 24, 2011	16:30	Final

== Abbreviations ==
- All distances shown are in meters:centimeters

PR	Pan American games record
WR	world record
NR	national record
PB	personal best
SB	season best
DNS	did not start
DNF	did not finish
DQ	disqualified

== Results ==
16 athletes from 11 countries competed.

=== Final ===
Rank	Athlete	Nationality	3.40	3.55	3.70	3.85	4.00	4.10	4.20	4.30	4.40	4.50	4.60	4.65	4.70	4.75	4.80	Result	Notes
1st place, gold medalist(s)	Yarisley Silva	Cuba	–	–	–	–	–	–	–	o	o	o	o	–	o	o	xxx	4.75	PR, NR
2nd place, silver medalist(s)	Fabiana Murer	Brazil	–	–	–	–	–	–	–	–	–	xxo	x–	xo	o	x-	xx	4.70	
3rd place, bronze medalist(s)	Becky Holliday	United States	–	–	–	–	–	xo	–	o	–	xxx						4.30	
4	Karla da Silva	Brazil	–	–	–	–	–	–	o	xo	xxx							4.30	
5	Keisa Monterola	Venezuela	–	–	–	–	xo	o	o	xxo	xxx							4.30	
6	Alejandra García	Argentina	–	–	–	–	xo	xo	o	xxx								4.20	
7	Dailis Caballero	Cuba	–	–	–	–	o	o	xxx									4.10	
7	Victoria Robson	Canada	–	–	–	–	–	o	xxx									4.10	
9	Daniela Inchausti	Argentina	–	–	o	o	o	xxx										4.00	
10	Carmelita Correa	Mexico	–	o	o	o	xxx											3.85	
11	Cecilia Villar	Mexico	–	o	o	xxo	xxx											3.85	
12	Déborah Gyurcsek	Uruguay	–	xxo	xo	xxx												3.70	
13	Maria Ferrand	Peru	xo	o	xxx													3.55	
14	Jessica Fu	Peru	–	xxo	xxx													3.55	
15	Catalina Amarilla	Paraguay	xo	xxx														3.40	
	Andrea Zambrana	Puerto Rico	–	–	–	xxx												NM	
