= Justyna Śmietanka =

Polish pole vaulter

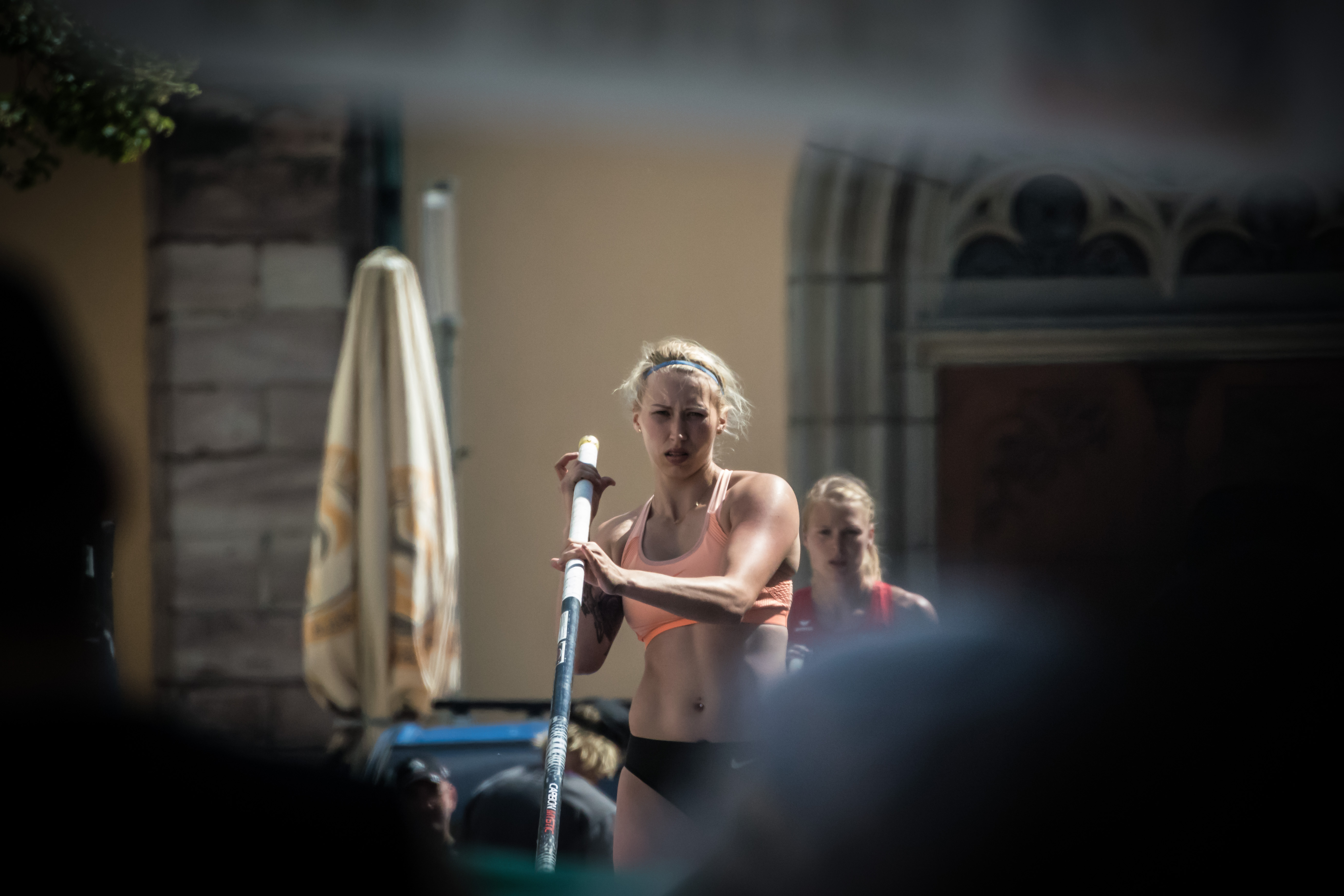
Image of Justyna Śmietanka

Justyna Śmietanka (pronounced: [jusˈtɨ.na ɕmjɛˈta.nka]; born 24 September 1994) is a Polish pole vaulter.

She finished fifth at the 2017 Summer Universiade. She also competed at the 2015 European U23 Championships and the 2016 European Championships without reaching the final.

Her personal best vault is 4.45 metres, achieved in July 2017 in Rottach-Egern.
