= Morgann LeLeux =

American pole vaulter (born 1992)

Personal information
- Full name: Morgann LeLeux Romero
- Born: November 14, 1992 (age 33) New Iberia, Louisiana

Sport
- Country: United States
- Sport: Athletics
- Event: Pole vault
- College team: Georgia Lady Bulldogs

Achievements and titles
- Personal best: Pole vault: 4.70 m (15 ft 5 in) (Eugene 2021)

Morgann Leleux Romero (born November 14, 1992) is an American track and field athlete who specialises in the pole vault. In 2021, she competed at the 2020 Olympic Games in Tokyo where she advanced to the finals.

== Personal life ==
Leleux is originally from New Iberia, Louisiana. She has been married to Jacob Romero since December 2016.

== Career ==
Leleux was an All-American at the University of Georgia and 2016 All-American at the University of Louisiana.

On 26 June 2021, at the U.S. Olympic Trials at Hayward Field in Eugene, Oregon, Leleux finished second with a height of 4.70m behind winner Katie Nageotte, to secure a spot on the American team for the delayed 2020 Summer Olympics.
