= Yarisley Silva =

Cuban pole vaulter

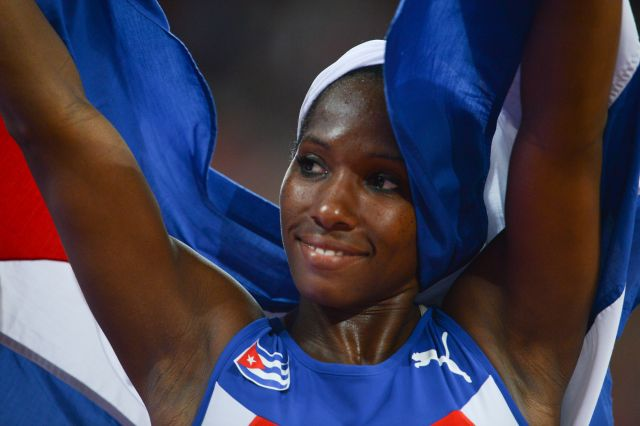

Personal information
- Full name: Yarisley Silva Rodríguez
- Born: 1 June 1987 (age 39) San Luis, Pinar del Río, Cuba
- Height: 1.61 m (5 ft 3 in)
- Weight: 63 kg (139 lb)

Sport
- Country: Cuba
- Sport: Athletics
- Event: Pole vault
- Coached by: Alexander Navas

Achievements and titles
- Personal best: 4.91 m
Medal record
Event	1st	2nd	3rd
Olympic Games	0	1	0
World Championships	1	0	2
World Indoor Championships	1	0	0
Pan American Games	3	0	1
Total	5	1	3
Olympic Games
Silver medal – second place	2012 London	Pole vault
World Championships
Gold medal – first place	2015 Beijing	Pole vault
Bronze medal – third place	2013 Moscow	Pole vault
Bronze medal – third place	2017 London	Pole vault
World Indoor Championships
Gold medal – first place	2014 Sopot	Pole vault
Pan American Games
Gold medal – first place	2011 Guadalajara	Pole vault
Gold medal – first place	2015 Toronto	Pole vault
Gold medal – first place	2019 Lima	Pole vault
Bronze medal – third place	2007 Rio de Janeiro	Pole vault
- Updated on 7 January 2015

Yarisley Silva Rodríguez (born 1 June 1987) is a Cuban pole vaulter. She won the silver medal at the 2012 Summer Olympics – the first Latin American athlete to win an Olympic medal in that event.

Silva became the first Cuban woman to reach a world class standard in the pole vault. Her personal bests of 4.90 m (16 ft 3/4 in) outdoors and 4.78 m (15 ft 8 in) indoors are the Cuban and Central American and Caribbean records for the event.

She emerged at the regional level with a silver medal at the 2006 Central American and Caribbean Games, and a bronze medal at the 2007 Pan American Games. She then won gold medals at the 2009 Central American and Caribbean Championships in Athletics and the 2011 Pan American Games.

Silva represented Cuba at the 2008 Summer Olympics and came fifth at the 2011 World Championships in Athletics.

== Career ==
=== Early career ===
Born in Pinar del Río in Cuba, Silva began to participate in pole vault competitions from the age of twelve. Many women in her family took part in athletics and her mother was a javelin thrower. In spite of its strong traditions in track and field, pole vaulting was a discipline in which Cuba had not historically been successful. As a result, Silva quickly established herself nationally at the age of sixteen, coming second at the Cuban Athletics Championships and winning the Barrientos Memorial in 2003. In 2004, she cleared four metres for the first time, which was a Central American and Caribbean junior record. She improved this to 4.10 m at the 2005 Barrientos meet, winning the competition again.

The 2006 season saw her win her first national title and take a third Barrientos Memorial win. She competed internationally for the first time, taking silver at the Central American and Caribbean Games, but failing to clear a height at the 2006 World Junior Championships in Athletics after her poles did not arrive at the competition. Silva ended the season having improved her regional junior record to 4.20 m. In her first year of senior competition she won gold at the 2007 ALBA Games and a bronze at the 2007 Pan American Games. The latter was her country's first medal in the event at the Games and she broke the Central American and Caribbean record with her clearance of 4.30 m. She improved to 4.50 m in early 2008, but a lack of high level competitions meant she managed on 4.15 m in qualifying on her Olympic debut in Beijing.

Silva competed solely in Havana in 2009 and 2010, but still managed to equal her personal best, win the Barrientos meet, and take the gold medal at the 2009 Central American and Caribbean Championships in Athletics with a championship record of 4.40 m.

=== International competition and Olympic medal ===
The 2011 season marked the first time she gained the chance to compete on the international circuit against world class opposition. She competed extensively and had a series of top three finishes across Europe. She broke her personal best on five occasions that year, improving from 4.55 m to 4.75 m over the course of the year.

Silva, coached by Alexander Navas, and her fellow Cuban vaulter Lazaro Borges both emerged as top level athletes in the men's and women's pole vault that year. At the 2011 World Championships in Athletics she came fifth in the final with a regional record vault of 4.70 m, while Borges broke the Cuban record to take the men's silver medal. The pair took gold medals in their events at the end-of-season 2011 Pan American Games, where Silva beat world champion Fabiana Murer with a games record mark of 4.75 m.

Her first indoor meetings came at the start of 2012. In February she set Cuban indoor records of 4.60 m at the Pole Vault Stars meet, 4.71 m at the Meeting Pas de Calais, then 4.72 m at the XL Galan, finishing in the top three each time. Silva placed seventh at the 2012 IAAF World Indoor Championships. Outdoors she competed five times on the 2012 IAAF Diamond League circuit and was always in the top three, including a victory at the DN Galan. At the 2012 London Olympics she equalled her personal best of 4.75 m in the women's pole vault final to place second behind Jenn Suhr and win the silver medal – an Olympic first in the pole vault by a Latin American athlete.

Silva began 2013 with a world-leading mark of 4.76 m to win the Pole Vault Stars meeting. She added two centimetres to this mark two weeks later while winning the XL Galan. Returning to Havana for the national championships in March, she vaulted over 4.81 m to add six centimetres to her outdoor best. Taking aim at greater heights, she altered her technique, holding the pole higher and extending her run-up. Silva improved her record again at the Drake Relays on 26 April, winning with 4.85 m and beating Suhr and then cleared 4.90 in Hengelo, Netherlands. She took the bronze medal at the World Athletics Championships in Moscow with a jump of 4.82 m, behind Yelena Isinbayeva and Jennifer Suhr.

During winter 2014, Silva became world champion at the World Indoor Championships held in Sopot. She later won the outdoor world title at the 2015 World Championships in Beijing jumping 4.90 m.

== Personal bests ==
- Outdoor pole vault: 4.91 m – Beckum, Germany 2 August 2015
- Indoor pole vault: 4.82 m – Des Moines, United States 24 April 2013

== Achievements ==
Year	Competition	Venue	Position	Notes
Representing Cuba
2006	Central American and Caribbean Games	Cartagena, Colombia	2nd	3.95 m
2006	World Junior Championships	Beijing, China	–	NH
2007	ALBA Games	Caracas, Venezuela	1st	4.15 m
2007	Pan American Games	Rio de Janeiro, Brazil	3rd	4.30 m
2008	Olympic Games	Beijing, China	27th (q)	4.15 m
2009	Central American and Caribbean Championships	Havana, Cuba	1st	4.40 m
2011	World Championships	Daegu, South Korea	5th	4.70 m
2011	Pan American Games	Guadalajara, Mexico	1st	4.75 m
2012	World Indoor Championships	Istanbul, Turkey	7th	4.55 m
2012	Olympic Games	London, United Kingdom	2nd	4.75 m
2013	World Championships	Moscow, Russia	3rd	4.82 m
2014	World Indoor Championships	Sopot, Poland	1st	4.70 m
2014	Central American and Caribbean Games	Xalapa, Mexico	1st	4.60 m A
2015	Pan American Games	Toronto, Canada	1st	4.85 m
2015	World Championships	Beijing, China	1st	4.90 m
2016	Olympic Games	Rio de Janeiro, Brazil	7th	4.60 m
2017	World Championships	London, United Kingdom	3rd	4.65 m
2018	World Indoor Championships	Birmingham, United Kingdom	7th	4.60 m
2018	Central American and Caribbean Games	Barranquilla, Colombia	1st	4.70 m
2018	NACAC Championships	Toronto, Canada	2nd	4.70 m
2019	Pan American Games	Lima, Peru	1st	4.75 m
2019	World Championships	Doha, Qatar	11th	4.70 m
2021	Olympic Games	Tokyo, Japan	8th	4.50 m
