= Sonia Malavisi =

Italian pole vaulter (born 1994)

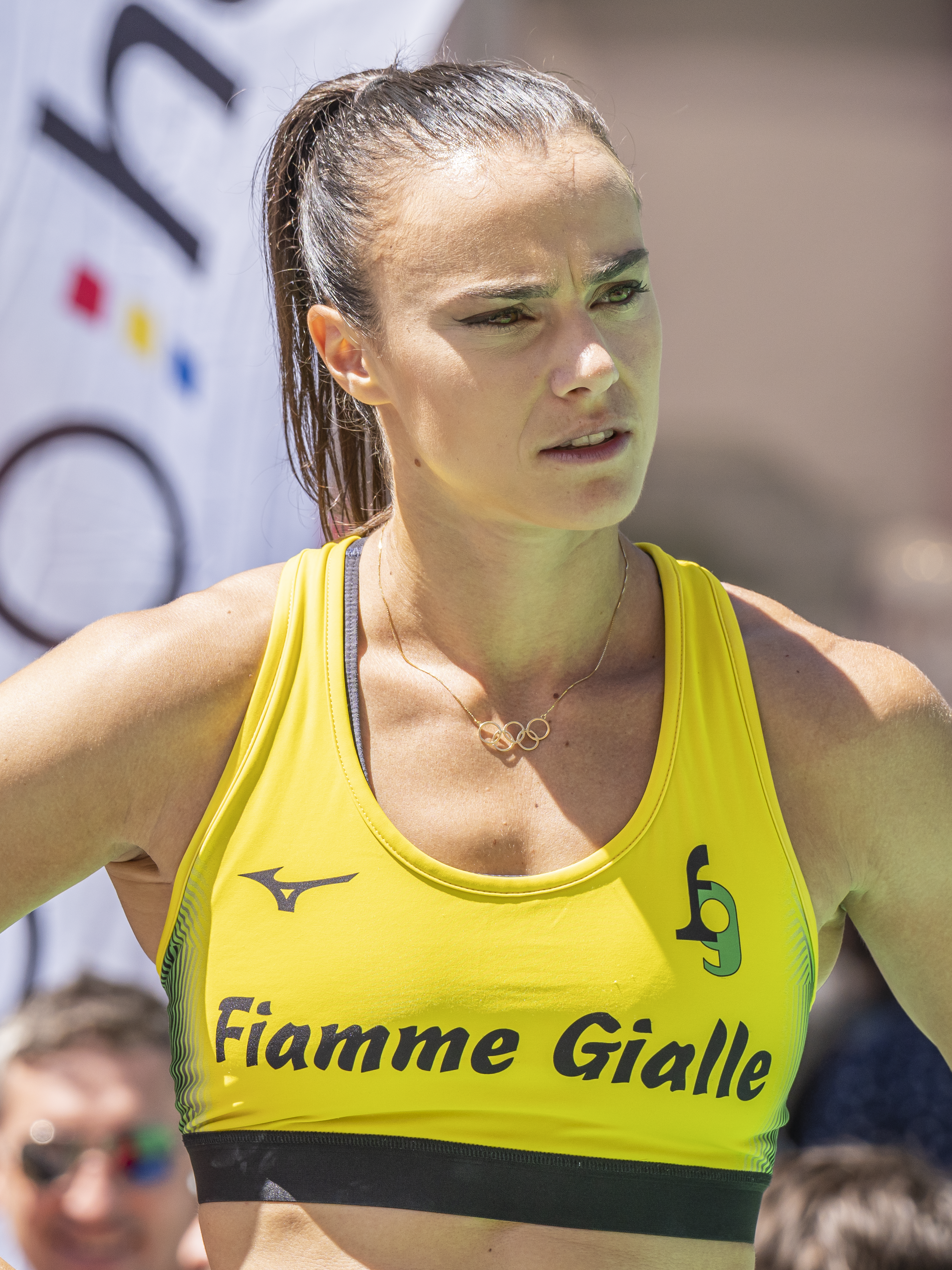
- Malavisi in 2025

Personal information
- Nationality: Italian
- Born: 31 October 1994 (age 31) Rome, Italy
- Height: 1.72 m (5 ft 7 1/2 in)
- Weight: 65 kg (143 lb)

Sport
- Country: Italy
- Sport: Athletics
- Event: Pole vault
- Club: Acsi Italia Atletica; G.S. Fiamme Gialle
- Coached by: Alexandre Navas Paez; Emanuel Margesin (2019-)

Achievements and titles
- Personal best: Pole vault: 4.51 (2016)
Medal record
European Junior Championships
Bronze medal – third place	2013 Rieti	Pole vault
Mediterranean Games
Bronze medal – third place	2026 Taranto	Pole vault

Sonia Malavisi (born 31 October 1994) is an Italian pole vaulter.

== Career ==
A fellow Roman like her compatriot Roberta Bruni, she also comes from the Artistic Gymnastics. At the pole vault, her junior personal best (4.42 m) is the second best junior world performance in 2013 and 49th at senior level.

By clearing 4.50m at Castiglione della Pescaia on 17 May 2016, she qualified for the 2016 Olympic Games in Rio de Janeiro, where she ranked 21st, clearing 4.45m.

Her personal best is 4.51m on 17 July 2016 during the 30th Meeting Internazionale Città di Padova.

== National records ==
Junior

- Pole vault: 4.42 m ( (Italy) Rieti, 5 July 2013) - Current holder

== Progression ==
Personal best

Pole vault outdoor

Year	Performance	Venue	Date
2021	4.45	(Italy) Florence	15 MAY 2021
2020	4.30	(Italy) Rieti	08 AUG 2020
2019	4.46	(Poland) Bydgoszcz	10 AUG 2019
2018	4.36	(Greece) Athens	22 JUN 2018
2017	4.40	(Italy) Rieti	21 MAY 2017
2016	4.51	(Italy) Padua	17 JUL 2016
2015	4.40	(Italy) Rieti	28 JUN 2015
2014	4.35	(Italy) Rieti	29 JUN 2014
2013	4.42	(Italy) Rieti	05 JUL 2013
2012	4.05	(Spain) Barcelona	12 JUL 2012
2011	3.80	(Italy) Rieti	01 OCT 2011
2010	3.30	(Italy) Rieti	12 SEP 2010

== Achievements ==
Year	Competition	Venue	Position	Event	Performance	Notes
2012	World Junior Championships	(Spain) Barcelona	Qual	Pole vault	4.05 m	
2013	European Team Championships	(United Kingdom) Gateshead	6th	Pole vault	4.25 m	
2013	European Junior Championships	(Italy) Rieti	3rd	Pole vault	4.20 m	
2015	European U23 Championships	(Estonia) Tallinn	11th	Pole vault	4.05 m	
2016	Olympic Games	(Brazil) Rio de Janeiro	21st	Pole vault	4.45 m	
2019	European Team Championships	(Poland) Bydgoszcz	5th	Pole vault	4.46 m	SB

== National titles ==
Senior (4)

- Italian Athletics Championships
  - Pole vault: 2015, 2016
- Italian Athletics Indoor Championships
  - Pole vault: 2016, 2019

She also won one youth (2011) and one junior (2013) individual national championship.

== See also ==
- Italian all-time lists - Pole vault
