= Annika Roloff =

German pole vaulter

Personal information
- Born: 10 March 1991 (age 35) Holzminden, Germany
- Height: 166 cm (5 ft 5 in)
- Weight: 58 kg (128 lb)

Sport
- Country: Germany
- Sport: Track and field
- Event: Pole vault
- University team: University of Akron

Annika Roloff (born 10 March 1991) is a German athlete who specialises in the pole vault. She competed collegiately for the University of Akron, where she won the 2014 NCAA Pole Vault Championships.

She qualified for the 2016 Summer Olympics. At the 2016 Summer Olympics, she finished in 21st place in the qualifying round and did not advance to the final. In 2011, she won a bronze medal at the European U23 Championships.

== Personal bests ==
=== Outdoor ===
Event	Record	Venue	Date
Pole vault	4.60	Landau	28 June 2016

=== Indoor ===
Event	Record	Venue	Date
Pole vault	4.51	Potsdam	3 February 2017
