= Greece at the 2025 World Athletics Championships =

- Flag of Greece
- WA code: GRE

in Tokyo, Japan 13 September 2023 – 21 September 2023
- Competitors: 19 (8 men and 11 women) in 14 events
- Medals Ranked 27th: Gold 0 Silver 1 Bronze 0 Total 1

World Athletics Championships appearances (overview)
- 1983; 1987; 1991; 1993; 1995; 1997; 1999; 2001; 2003; 2005; 2007; 2009; 2011; 2013; 2015; 2017; 2019; 2022; 2023; 2025

Greece competed at the 2025 World Athletics Championships in Tokyo, Japan, from 13 to 21 September 2025. A team of 19 athletes, 11 women and 8 men, represented the country in a total of 14 events.

== Medalists ==
Medal	Athlete	Event	Date
Silver	Emmanouil Karalis	Men's pole vault	September 15

== Results ==
Greece entered 19 athletes.

Key

- Q = Qualified for the next round
- q = Qualified for the next round as a fastest loser or, in field events, by position without achieving the qualifying target
- NR = National record
- PB = Personal best
- SB = Season best
- NM = No mark
- N/A = Round not applicable for the event

=== Men ===
Track and road events

Athlete	Event	Final	
Athlete	Event	Result	Rank
Alexandros Papamichail	35 km walk	2:42:07	29
Alexandros Papamichail	20 km walk	Did not start	

Field events

Athlete	Event	Qualification		Final	
Athlete	Event	Result	Position	Result	Position
Emmanouíl Karalis	Pole vault	5.75m	=1 q	6.00m	2nd place, silver medalist(s)
Ioannis Rizos	Pole vault	5.40m	30	Did not advance	
Miltiadis Tentoglou	Long jump	8.17m	3 Q	7.83m	11
Dimitrios Pavlidis	Discus throw	62.49m	22	Did not advance	
Angelos Mantzouranis	Hammer throw	70.94m	34	Did not advance	
Christos Frantzeskakis	Hammer throw	75.43m	15	Did not advance	
Konstantinos Zaltos	Hammer throw	73.96m	20	Did not advance	

=== Women ===
Track and road events

Athlete	Event	Heat		Semifinal		Final	
Athlete	Event	Result	Rank	Result	Rank	Result	Rank
Polyniki Emmanouilidou	100m	11.36	4	Did not advance			
Polyniki Emmanouilidou	200m	22.92 SB	3 Q	23.04	7	Did not advance	
Antigoni Ntrismpioti	35 km walk	—N/a				DNF	
Olga Fiaska	35 km walk	—N/a				2:59:59 SB	18
Sofia Alikanioti	35 km walk	—N/a				3:21:06	37
Christina Papadopoulou	20 km walk	—N/a				1:35:05 SB	34
Panagiota Tsinopoulou	20 km walk	—N/a				1:37:40 SB	39
Antigoni Ntrismpioti	20 km walk	—N/a				1:29:47	16

Field events

Athlete	Event	Qualification		Final	
Athlete	Event	Result	Position	Result	Position
Tatiana Gusin	High jump	1.83m	25	Did not advance	
Ariadni Adamopoulou	Pole vault	4.25m	24	Did not advance	
Oxana Koreneva	Triple jump	13.66m	24	Did not advance	
Stamatia Skarvelis	Hammer throw	70.05m	16	Did not advance	
Elina Tzengko	Javelin throw	61.31m	11 q	62.72	5
