= Greece at the World Athletics Championships =

- WA code: GRE
- National federation: Hellenic Athletics Federation
- Website: www.segas.gr
- Medals Ranked 32nd: Gold 6 Silver 8 Bronze 12 Total 26

World Athletics Championships appearances (overview)
- 1983; 1987; 1991; 1993; 1995; 1997; 1999; 2001; 2003; 2005; 2007; 2009; 2011; 2013; 2015; 2017; 2019; 2022; 2023; 2025

Greece has competed in every World Athletics Championships since the event's first edition in 1983.

== Summary ==
*Red border color indicates tournament was held on home soil.

Championships	Athletes	Gold	Silver	Bronze	Total	Rank
1983 Helsinki		0	0	1	1	21
1987 Rome		0	0	0	0	–
1991 Tokyo		0	0	0	0	–
1993 Stuttgart		0	0	0	0	–
1995 Gothenburg		0	0	0	0	–
1997 Athens	27	0	1	1	2	29
1999 Seville	42	2	2	2	6	4
2001 Edmonton	26	1	2	2	5	15
2003 Paris	45	1	1	3	5	10
2005 Helsinki	24	0	0	0	0	–
2007 Osaka	27	0	0	0	0	-
2009 Berlin	21	0	0	0	0	–
2011 Daegu	12	0	0	0	0	–
2013 Moscow	17	0	0	0	0	–
2015 Beijing	10	0	0	1	1	32
2017 London	21	1	0	0	1	24
2019 Doha	16	0	0	1	1	31
2022 Eugene	19	0	1	0	1	33
2023 Budapest	22	1	0	1	2	15
2025 Tokyo	19	0	1	0	1	27
2027 Beijing	To be determined					
2029 Nairobi	To be determined					
2031 Munich	To be determined					
Total		6	8	12	26	33

== Medalists ==
Name	Championships	Event	Medal
Mirela Manjani	1999 Seville	Women's javelin throw	Gold
Mirela Manjani	2003 Paris	Women's javelin throw	Gold
Mirela Manjani	2001 Edmonton	Women's javelin throw	Silver
Miltiadis Tentoglou	2023 Budapest	Men's long jump	Gold
Miltiadis Tentoglou	2022 Eugene	Men's long jump	Silver
Katerina Stefanidi	2017 London	Women's pole vault	Gold
Katerina Stefanidi	2019 Doha	Women's pole vault	Bronze
Paraskevi Tsiamita	1999 Seville	Women's triple jump	Gold
Konstantinos Kenteris	2001 Edmonton	Men's 200 metres	Gold
Anastasia Kelesidou	1999 Seville	Women's discus throw	Silver
Anastasia Kelesidou	2003 Paris	Women's discus throw	Silver
Anastasia Kelesidou	2001 Edmonton	Women's discus throw	Bronze
Konstadinos Gatsioudis	1999 Seville	Men's javelin throw	Silver
Konstadinos Gatsioudis	1997 Athens	Men's javelin throw	Bronze
Konstadinos Gatsioudis	2001 Edmonton	Men's javelin throw	Bronze
Ekaterini Thanou	2001 Edmonton	Women's 100 metres	Silver
Ekaterini Thanou	1999 Seville	Women's 100 metres	Bronze
Ekaterini Thanou	2003 Paris	Women's 100 metres	Bronze
Niki Xanthou	1997 Athens	Women's long jump	Silver
Emmanouil Karalis	2025 Tokyo	Men's pole vault	Silver
Anna Verouli	1983 Helsinki	Women's javelin throw	Bronze
Olga Vasdeki	1999 Seville	Women's triple jump	Bronze
Periklis Iakovakis	2003 Paris	Men's 400 metres hurdles	Bronze
Ekaterini Voggoli	2003 Paris	Women's discus throw	Bronze
Nikoleta Kyriakopoulou	2015 Beijing	Women's pole vault	Bronze
Antigoni Drisbioti	2023 Budapest	Women's 35 km walk	Bronze

== Doping disqualifications ==
Athlete	Sex	Event	Year(s)	Result	Notes
Hrisopiyí Devetzí	Women	Triple jump	2007	~~(bronze) Bronze~~	
Iríni Kokkinaríou	Women	3000 m steeplechase	2009 2011	~~8th (q, 2009)~~ ~~11th (q, 2011)~~	Disqualified at two editions

== See also ==
- Greece at the IAAF World Indoor Championships in Athletics
- Greece at the European Athletics Championships
- Greece at the European Athletics Indoor Championships
