= Greece at the 2017 World Championships in Athletics =

- WA code: GRE
- National federation: Hellenic Amateur Athletic Association
- Website: www.segas.gr

in (United Kingdom) London
- Competitors: 21 in 18 events
- Medals Ranked =23rd: Gold 1 Silver 0 Bronze 0 Total 1

World Championships in Athletics appearances (overview)
- 1983; 1987; 1991; 1993; 1995; 1997; 1999; 2001; 2003; 2005; 2007; 2009; 2011; 2013; 2015; 2017; 2019; 2022; 2023; 2025

Greece competed at the 2017 World Championships in Athletics in London, United Kingdom, from 4–13 August 2017. A team of 21 athletes, 9 men and 12 women, represented the country in a total of 18 events.

== Medalists ==
Medal	Name	Event	Notes
Gold	Katerina Stefanidi	Women's pole vault	4.91 m NR, WL

== Results ==
Key

- Q = Qualified for the next round
- q = Qualified for the next round as a fastest loser or, in field events, by position without achieving the qualifying target
- NR = National record
- PB = Personal best
- SB = Season best
- NM = No mark
- N/A = Round not applicable for the event

=== Men ===
Track and road events

Athlete	Event	Heat		Semifinal		Final	
Athlete	Event	Result	Rank	Result	Rank	Result	Rank
Lykourgos-Stefanos Tsakonas	200 metres	20.37	10 Q	20.73	21	Did not advance	
Konstadinos Douvalidis	110 metres hurdles	13.62	28	Did not advance			
Alexandros Papamichail	20 kilometres walk	—N/a				1:25:56	42

Field events

Athlete	Event	Qualification		Final	
Athlete	Event	Distance	Position	Distance	Position
Emmanouíl Karalis	Pole vault	5.45	17	Did not advance	
Konstadinos Filippidis	Pole vault	DNS	–	Did not advance	
Miltiadis Tentoglou	Long jump	7.79	19	Did not advance	
Dimitrios Tsiamis	Triple jump	16.06	28	Did not advance	
Ioannis Kyriazis	Javelin throw	84.60	6 Q	84.52	6
Mihail Anastasakis	Hammer throw	70.94	28	Did not advance	

=== Women ===
Track and road events

Athlete	Event	Heat		Semifinal		Final	
Athlete	Event	Result	Rank	Result	Rank	Result	Rank
Maria Belibasaki	200 metres	23.16	14 Q	23.21	17	Did not advance	
Iríni Vasiliou	400 metres	52.61	23 Q	53.27	23	Did not advance	
Gloria Privileggio	Marathon	—N/a				2:57:06	71
Ourania Rebouli	Marathon	—N/a				DNF	–
Elisavet Pesiridou	100 metres hurdles	13.14	24	Did not advance			
Antigoni Drisbioti	20 kilometres walk	—N/a				1:32:03	24
Despina Zapounidou	20 kilometres walk	—N/a				DNF	–

Field events

Athlete	Event	Qualification		Final	
Athlete	Event	Distance	Position	Distance	Position
Tatiana Gusin	High jump	1.85	26	Did not advance	
Katerina Stefanidi	Pole vault	4.60	1 Q	4.91 NR	1st place, gold medalist(s)
Haido Alexouli	Long jump	5.94	26	Did not advance	
Paraskevi Papachristou	Triple jump	13.75	20	Did not advance	
Chrysoula Anagnostopoulou	Discus throw	56.91	22	Did not advance	
