= Greece at the 2022 World Athletics Championships =

Greece at the 2022 World Championships in Athletics
- WA code: GRE
- National federation: Hellenic Amateur Athletic Association
- Website: www.segas.gr

in (United States) Eugene
- Competitors: 19 in 13 events
- Medals Ranked 33rd: Gold 0 Silver 1 Bronze 0 Total 1

World Championships in Athletics appearances (overview)
- 1983; 1987; 1991; 1993; 1995; 1997; 1999; 2001; 2003; 2005; 2007; 2009; 2011; 2013; 2015; 2017; 2019; 2022; 2023; 2025

Greece competed at the 2022 World Athletics Championships in Eugene, Oregon, United States, from 15 July to 24 July 2022. A team of 19 athletes, 12 women and 7 men, represented the country in a total of 13 events.

== Medalists ==
| Medal | Athlete | Event | Date |
|---|---|---|---|
| Silver | Miltiadis Tentoglou | Long jump | 16 July |

== Results ==
Key

- Q = Qualified for the next round
- q = Qualified for the next round as a fastest loser or, in field events, by position without achieving the qualifying target
- NR = National record
- PB = Personal best
- SB = Season best
- NM = No mark
- N/A = Round not applicable for the event

=== Men ===
Track and road events

| Athlete | Event | Heat | | Semifinal | | Final | |
| Athlete | Event | Result | Rank | Result | Rank | Result | Rank |
|---|---|---|---|---|---|---|---|
| Alexandros Papamichail | 35 kilometres walk | —N/a | | | | 2:34:48 NR | 29 |

Field events

| Athlete | Event | Qualification | | Final | |
| Athlete | Event | Result | Position | Result | Position |
|---|---|---|---|---|---|
| Emmanouíl Karalis | Pole vault | 5.50 | 22 | Did not advance | |
| Miltiadis Tentoglou | Long jump | 8.03 | 6 | 8.32 | 2nd place, silver medalist(s) |
| Christos Frantzeskakis | Hammer throw | 76.03 | 10 | 77.04 | 9 |
| Mihail Anastasakis | Hammer throw | 72.40 | 25 | Did not advance | |
| Anastasios Latifllari | Shot put | 18.90 | 26 | Did not advance | |
| Nicholas Scarvelis | Shot put | 19.55 | 25 | Did not advance | |

=== Women ===
Track and road events

| Athlete | Event | Heat | | Semifinal | | Final | |
| Athlete | Event | Result | Rank | Result | Rank | Result | Rank |
|---|---|---|---|---|---|---|---|
| Antigoni Drisbioti | 35 kilometres walk | —N/a | | | | 2:41:58 NR | 4 |
| Efstathia Kourkoutsaki | 35 kilometres walk | —N/a | | | | 3:02:27 PB | 27 |
| Kiriaki Filtisakou | 20 kilometres walk | —N/a | | | | 1:34:55 SB | 22 |
| Christina Papadopoulou | 20 kilometres walk | —N/a | | | | 1:37:20 SB | 28 |

Field events

| Athlete | Event | Qualification | | Final | |
| Athlete | Event | Result | Position | Result | Position |
|---|---|---|---|---|---|
| Katerina Stefanidi | Pole vault | 4.50 | =1 | 4.70 SB | 5 |
| Nikoleta Kiriakopoulou | Pole vault | 4.35 | 23 | Did not advance | |
| Eleni-Klaoudia Polak | Pole vault | 4.35 | 21 | Did not advance | |
| Tatiana Gusin | High jump | 1.90 =SB | 13 | Did not advance | |
| Spyridoula Karydi | Triple jump | 13.63 | 24 | Did not advance | |
| Elina Tzengko | Javelin throw | 57.12 | 20 | Did not advance | |
| Stamatia Skarvelis | Hammer throw | 67.20 | 26 | Did not advance | |
| Chrysoula Anagnostopoulou | Discus throw | 58.15 | 19 | Did not advance | |

== Sources ==
- Official website
- Official IAAF competition website
- ΟΡΕΓΚΟΝ 2022: Με 18μελη αποστολή στο παγκόσμιο η Εθνική (in Greek)
