= Balkan Race Walking Championships =

The Balkan Race Walking Championships is an annual racewalking competition between athletes from member nations of Balkan Athletics. The championships features six individual races: senior men's and women's 20 kilometres race walks, men's and women's under-20 10 kilometres race walks, an under-18 boys' 10 km walk, and an under-18 girls' 5 kilometres race walk. Each individual race also has a national team component with points awarded based on finishing time, which are then totalled to form an overall team score for the championships.

Balkan racewalking competitions originated in the main Balkan Athletics Championships. A men's 20 km walk was first held in 1961 and a women's 10 km walk was introduced in 1988 (later increased to a 20 km race in 2001). One-off indoor walks were also held at the Balkan Indoor Athletics Championships in 1994. The Balkan championships for racewalking were first held separately from the main championships in 2000, though Balkan Athletics starting their official numbering of a discrete Balkan Race Walking Championships from 2002 onwards.

== List of winners (20 km) ==
Edition	Year	Venue	Country	Date	Senior men's winner	Time	Senior women's winner	Time	Team winner
1st	2002	Vlasotince	Yugoslavia		Silviu Casandra (ROM)	1:22:06	Nevena Mineva-Dimitrova (BUL)	1:32:16	—
2nd	2003	Ruse	Bulgaria		Predrag Filipović (SCG)	1:22:40	Veronica Budileanu (ROM)	1:35:12	—
3rd	2004	Reșița	Romania		Costică Bălan (ROM)	1:21:51	Athina Papayianni (GRE)	1:28:58	—
4th	2005	Preveza	Greece		Silviu Casandra (ROM)	1:25:48	Evangelia Xinou (GRE)	1:35:35	—
5th	2006	Istanbul	Turkey		Predrag Filipović (SCG)	1:22:31	Ana Maria Groza (ROM)	1:30:46	—
6th	2007	Galați	Romania		Recep Çelik (TUR)	1:23:10	Alina Olaru (ROM)	1:33:14	—
7th	2008	Bucharest	Romania	12 April	Predrag Filipović (SRB)	1:26:59	Veronica Budileanu (ROM)	1:34:37	—
8th	2009	Bucharest	Romania		Dragoș Neacșu (ROM)	1:23:21.20	Ana Maria Groza (ROM)	1:29:56.30	—
9th	2010	Bucharest	Romania		Silviu Casandra (ROM)	1:23:29.30	Ana Veronica Rodean (ROM)	1:37.26	—
10th	2011	Bucharest	Romania		Recep Çelik (TUR)	1:22:31	Claudia Ștef (ROM)	1:33:38	—
11th	2012	Bucharest	Romania		Predrag Filipović (SRB)	1:28:50	Ana Veronica Rodean (ROM)	1:35:17	—
12th	2013	Ayvalık	Turkey		Vladimir Savanović (SRB)	1:28:42	Adriana Georgiana Enache (ROM)	1:39:17	Turkey
13th	2014	Balchik	Bulgaria		Vladimir Savanović (SRB)	1:26.31	Despina Zapounidou (GRE)	1:34.56	Romania
14th	2015	Ayvalık	Turkey		Şahin Şenoduncu (TUR)	1:27:30	Andreea Arsine (ROM)	1:39:36	Turkey
15th	2016	Florina	Greece		Adrian Dragomir (ROM)	1:31:32	Panayiota Tsinopoulou (GRE)	1:38:29	Turkey
16th	2017	Florina	Greece		Alexandros Papamichail (GRE)	1:26:40	Antigoni Drisbioti (GRE)	1:34:00	Romania
17th	2018	Zrenjanin	Serbia		Dmytro Sobchuk (UKR)	1:26:27	Panayiota Tsinopoulou (GRE)	1:39:01	Turkey
18th	2019	Alexandroupoli	Greece		Alexandros Papamichail (GRE)	1:24:40	Panayiota Tsinopoulou (GRE)	1:34:55	Greece
19th	2020	Ivano-Frankivsk	Ukraine	14 March	Eduard Zabuzhenko (UKR)	1:20:46	Mariia Sakharuk (UKR)	1:30:22	Greece
20th	2021	Antalya	Turkey	27 March	Sahin Senoduncu (TUR)	1:24:20	Ayşe Tekdal (TUR)	1:30:12	Turkey
21st	2022	Athens	Greece	3 April	Narcis Mihăilă (ROU)	1:30:24	Ayşe Tekdal (TUR)	1:38:01	Turkey
22nd	2023	Antalya	Turkey	9 April	Mazlum Demir (TUR)	1:25:38	Antigoni Drisbioti (GRE)	1:29:56	Greece
