= Greece at the 2009 World Championships in Athletics =

- WA code: GRE
- National federation: Hellenic Amateur Athletic Association
- Website: www.segas.gr

in (Germany) Berlin
- Competitors: 21
- Medals: Gold 0 Silver 0 Bronze 0 Total 0

World Championships in Athletics appearances (overview)
- 1983; 1987; 1991; 1993; 1995; 1997; 1999; 2001; 2003; 2005; 2007; 2009; 2011; 2013; 2015; 2017; 2019; 2022; 2023; 2025

Greece competed with 21 athletes (7 men and 14 women) at the 2009 World Championships in Athletics, 15–23 August 2009 in Berlin, Germany. The team won no medals.

== Team selection ==
| Event | Athletes | |
| Event | Men | Women |
|---|---|---|
| 800 metres | | Eleni Filandra |
| 400 metre hurdles | Periklis Iakovakis | |
| 3000 m steeplechase | | Irini Kokkinariou |
| 20 km race walk | | Maria Hatzipanagiotidou; Evaggelia Xinou |
| 50 km race walk | Konstadinos Stefanopoulos | |
| Marathon | | Georgia Abatzidou; Magdalini Gazea |
| High jump | Konstadinos Baniotis | Antonia Stergiou |
| Long jump | Louis Tsatoumas | |
| Triple jump | Dimitrios Tsiamis | Paraskevi Papachristou; Athanasia Perra |
| Pole vault | Konstadinos Filippidis | Nikoleta Kyriakopoulou |
| Javelin throw | | Savva Lika |
| Hammer throw | Alexandros Papadimitriou | Stiliani Papadopoulou; Alexandra Papageorgiou |
| Heptathlon | — | Argiro Strataki |

== Results ==
=== Men ===
Track and road events

| Athlete | Event | Heat | | Semifinal | | Final | |
| Athlete | Event | Result | Rank | Result | Rank | Result | Rank |
|---|---|---|---|---|---|---|---|
| Periklis Iakovakis | 400m hurdles | 49.12 | 7 Q | 48.73 | 7 Q | 48.42 | 5 |
| Konstadinos Stefanopoulos | 50km race walk | | | | | | |

Field events

| Athlete | Event | Qualification | | Final | |
| Athlete | Event | Result | Rank | Result | Rank |
|---|---|---|---|---|---|
| Konstadinos Baniotis | High jump | | | | |
| Louis Tsatoumas | Long jump | | | | |
| Dimitrios Tsiamis | Triple jump | 16.23 | 33 | Did not advance | |
| Konstadinos Filippidis | Pole vault | | | | |
| Alexandros Papadimitriou | Hammer throw | 72.02 | 23 | Did not advance | |

=== Women ===
Track and road events

| Athlete | Event | Heat | | Semifinal | | Final | |
| Athlete | Event | Result | Rank | Result | Rank | Result | Rank |
|---|---|---|---|---|---|---|---|
| Eleni Filandra | 800m | 2:06.39 | 33 | Did not advance | | | |
| Irini Kokkinariou | 3000m steeplechase | 9:35.61 | 19 | | | Did not advance | |
| Maria Hatzipanagiotidou | 20km walk | | | | | DQ | |
| Evaggelia Xinou | 20km walk | | | | | 1:35:56 | 21 |
| Georgia Abatzidou | Marathon | | | | | | |
| Magdalini Gazea | Marathon | | | | | | |

Field events

| Athlete | Event | Qualification | | Final | |
| Athlete | Event | Result | Rank | Result | Rank |
|---|---|---|---|---|---|
| Antonia Stergiou | High jump | 1.92 | 13 | Did not advance | |
| Paraskevi Papachristou | Triple jump | 13.58 | 29 | Did not advance | |
| Athanasia Perra | Triple jump | 13.69 | 25 | Did not advance | |
| Nikoleta Kyriakopoulou | Pole vault | 4.40 | 19 | Did not advance | |
| Savva Lika | Javelin throw | 59.64 | 10 q | 60.29 | 8 |
| Stiliani Papadopoulou | Hammer throw | 67.33 | 21 | Did not advance | |
| Alexandra Papageorgiou | Hammer throw | 66.33 | 28 | Did not advance | |

Combined events

| Heptathlon | Event | Argiro Strataki | | |
| Heptathlon | Event | Results | Points | Rank |
|---|---|---|---|---|
| | 100 m hurdles | 14.17 | 954 | 23 |
| | High jump | 1.71 | 867 | 21 |
| | Shot Put | 13.93 | 723 | 16 |
| | 200 m | 25.93 | 803 | 25 |
| | Long jump | 5.87 | 810 | 18 |
| | Javelin throw | 42.87 | 722 | 14 |
| | 800 m | 2:16.72 | 869 | 17 |
| Total | | | 5748 | 19 |

== See also ==
- Greece at the IAAF World Championships in Athletics
