= Greece at the 2013 World Championships in Athletics =

- WA code: GRE
- National federation: Association Hellénique d'Athlétisme Amateur
- Website: www.segas.gr/segas/fmain.aspx

in (Russia) Moscow
- Competitors: 17
- Medals: Gold 0 Silver 0 Bronze 0 Total 0

World Championships in Athletics appearances (overview)
- 1983; 1987; 1991; 1993; 1995; 1997; 1999; 2001; 2003; 2005; 2007; 2009; 2011; 2013; 2015; 2017; 2019; 2022; 2023; 2025

Greece participated at the 2013 World Championships in Athletics in Moscow, Russia, from 10 to 18 August 2013. A team of 17 athletes (8 men, 9 women) represented the country in the event.

== Results ==
(q – qualified, NM – no mark, SB – season best)

=== Men ===
Track and road events

Athlete	Event	Preliminaries		Heats		Semifinals		Final	
Athlete	Event	Time	Rank	Time	Rank	Time	Rank	Time	Rank
Likoúrgos-Stéfanos Tsakonas	200 metres			20.55	14 q	20.56	17	did not advance	
Konstadínos Douvalidis	110 metres hurdles			13.55	19	Did not advance			
Aléxandros Papamihail	20 kilometres walk							1:23:48 SB	16
Aléxandros Papamihail	50 kilometres walk							DNS	–

Field events

Athlete	Event	Preliminaries		Final	
Athlete	Event	Width Height	Rank	Width Height	Rank
Loúis Tsatoumas	Long jump	8.00	6 q	7.98	10
Dimítrios Tsiamis	Triple jump	16.69	11 q	16.66	10
Konstadínos Baniotis	High jump	2.26	9 q	2.25	10
Adónios Mastoras	High jump	2.26	13	did not advance	
Konstadínos Filippidis	Pole vault	5.55	3 q	5.65	10

=== Women ===
Track and road events

Athlete	Event	Preliminaries		Heats		Semifinals		Final	
Athlete	Event	Time	Rank	Time	Rank	Time	Rank	Time	Rank
Maria Belibasaki	200 metres			23:41q	33	23:46	23	Did not advance	
Kalliopi Astropekaki	Marathon							2:47:12	29
Antigoni Drisbioti	20 kilometres walk							1:33:42 PB	32

Field events

Athlete	Event	Preliminaries		Final	
Athlete	Event	Width Height	Rank	Width Height	Rank
Níki Panetta	Triple jump	13.69	15	Did not advance	
Athanasía Perra	Triple jump	13.92	11 q	13.55	12
Antonia Stergiou	High jump	1.83	20	Did not advance	
Nikoléta Kiriakopoulou	Pole vault	4.45	13	Did not advance	
Stélla-Iró Ledaki	Pole vault	NM	-	Did not advance	

Heptathlon

Sofía Ifadidou	Heptathlon			
Sofía Ifadidou	Event	Results	Points	Rank
	100 m hurdles	13.93	988	22
	High jump	1.65	795	31
	Shot put	12.89	720	19
	200 m	25.94 SB	802	31
	Long jump	5.85	804	21
	Javelin throw	53.66	931	1
	800 m	2:17.74 SB	854	24
Total			5894	23

== See also ==
- Greece at the IAAF World Championships in Athletics
