= Greece at the 2019 World Athletics Championships =

Greece at the 2019 World Championships in Athletics
- WA code: GRE
- National federation: Hellenic Amateur Athletic Association
- Website: www.segas.gr

in (Qatar) Doha
- Competitors: 16 in 13 events
- Medals Ranked 31st: Gold 0 Silver 0 Bronze 1 Total 1

World Championships in Athletics appearances (overview)
- 1983; 1987; 1991; 1993; 1995; 1997; 1999; 2001; 2003; 2005; 2007; 2009; 2011; 2013; 2015; 2017; 2019; 2022; 2023

Greece competed at the 2019 World Championships in Athletics in Doha, Qatar, from 27 September to 6 October 2019. A team of 21 athletes, 7 men and 9 women, represented the country in a total of 13 events.

== Medalists ==
| Medal | Athlete | Event | Notes |
|---|---|---|---|
| Bronze | Katerina Stefanidi | Pole vault | 4.85 m SB |

== Results ==
Key

- Q = Qualified for the next round
- q = Qualified for the next round as a fastest loser or, in field events, by position without achieving the qualifying target
- NR = National record
- PB = Personal best
- SB = Season best
- NM = No mark
- N/A = Round not applicable for the event

=== Men ===
Track and road events

| Athlete | Event | Heat | | Semifinal | | Final | |
| Athlete | Event | Result | Rank | Result | Rank | Result | Rank |
|---|---|---|---|---|---|---|---|
| Konstadinos Douvalidis | 110 metres hurdles | 13.43 | 10 Q | 13.54 | 14 | Did not advance | |
| Alexandros Papamichail | 50 kilometres walk | — | | | | 4:22:39 | 17 |

Field events

| Athlete | Event | Qualification | | Final | |
| Athlete | Event | Distance | Position | Distance | Position |
|---|---|---|---|---|---|
| Emmanouíl Karalis | Pole vault | 5.60 | 15 | Did not advance | |
| Konstadinos Filippidis | Pole vault | 5.70 | 13 | Did not advance | |
| Miltiadis Tentoglou | Long jump | 8.00 | 7 q | 7.79 | 10 |
| Christos Frantzeskakis | Hammer throw | 72.96 | 23 | Did not advance | |
| Mihail Anastasakis | Hammer throw | 75.07 | 13 | Did not advance | |

=== Women ===
Track and road events

| Athlete | Event | Heat | | Semifinal | | Final | |
| Athlete | Event | Result | Rank | Result | Rank | Result | Rank |
|---|---|---|---|---|---|---|---|
| Rafaéla Spanoudaki | 200 metres | 23.48 | 34 | Did not advance | | | |
| Iríni Vasiliou | 400 metres | 52.31 | 36 | Did not advance | | | |
| Gloria Privileggio | Marathon | — | | | | 2:58:43 | 29 |
| Antigoni Drisbioti | 20 kilometres walk | — | | | | 1:38:56 | 22 |
| Angeliki Makri | 50 kilometres walk | — | | | | 4:54:09 | 14 |

Field events

| Athlete | Event | Qualification | | Final | |
| Athlete | Event | Distance | Position | Distance | Position |
|---|---|---|---|---|---|
| Katerina Stefanidi | Pole vault | 4.60 | 1 Q | 4.85 SB | 3rd place, bronze medalist(s) |
| Nikoleta Kiriakopoulou | Pole vault | 4.60 | 8 Q | 4.50 | 13 |
| Stamatia Skarvelis | Hammer throw | 69.65 | 17 | Did not advance | |
| Chrysoula Anagnostopoulou | Discus throw | 59.91 SB | 15 | Did not advance | |

== Sources ==
- Official website
- Official IAAF competition website
- Greek team (in Greek)
