= Greece at the 2023 World Athletics Championships =

- Flag of Greece
- WA code: GRE

in Budapest, Hungary 19 August 2023 – 27 August 2023
- Competitors: 22 (10 men and 12 women)
- Medals Ranked 15th: Gold 1 Silver 0 Bronze 1 Total 2

World Athletics Championships appearances (overview)
- 1983; 1987; 1991; 1993; 1995; 1997; 1999; 2001; 2003; 2005; 2007; 2009; 2011; 2013; 2015; 2017; 2019; 2022; 2023; 2025

Greece competed at the 2023 World Athletics Championships in Budapest, Hungary, from 19 August to 27 August 2023. A team of 22 athletes, 12 women and 10 men, will represent the country in a total of 15 events.

== Medalists ==
Medal	Athlete	Event	Date
Gold	Miltiadis Tentoglou	Men's long jump	August 24
Bronze	Antigoni Ntrismpioti	Women's 35 kilometres walk	August 24

== Results ==
Greece entered 22 athletes.

Key

- Q = Qualified for the next round
- q = Qualified for the next round as a fastest loser or, in field events, by position without achieving the qualifying target
- NR = National record
- PB = Personal best
- SB = Season best
- NM = No mark
- N/A = Round not applicable for the event

=== Men ===
Track and road events

Athlete	Event	Final	
Athlete	Event	Result	Rank
Alexandros Papamichail	20 kilometres walk	1:24:26 SB	38
Alexandros Papamichail	35 kilometres walk	DNF	

Field events

Athlete	Event	Qualification		Final	
Athlete	Event	Result	Position	Result	Position
Emmanouíl Karalis	Pole vault	NM		Did not advance	
Miltiadis Tentoglou	Long jump	8.25	3 Q	8.52 SB	1st place, gold medalist(s)
Nikolaos Andrikopoulos	Triple jump	15.77	27	Did not advance	
Andreas Pantazis	Triple jump	14.67	31	Did not advance	
Dimitris Tsiamis	Triple jump	16.22	23	Did not advance	
Odysseas Mouzenidis	Shot put	19.08	31	Did not advance	
Mihail Anastasakis	Hammer throw	75.76	8 q	75.49	10
Christos Frantzeskakis	Hammer throw	74.05	14	Did not advance	
Konstantinos Zaltos	Hammer throw	69.98	30	Did not advance	

=== Women ===
Track and road events

Athlete	Event	Heat		Semifinal		Final	
Athlete	Event	Result	Rank	Result	Rank	Result	Rank
Polyniki Emmanouilidou	200 metres	23.00	4 q	23.15	7	Did not advance	
Dimitra Gnafaki	400 metres hurdles	56.18 SB	6	Did not advance			
Kyriaki Filtisakou	20 kilometres walk	—N/a				1:37:51	37
Antigoni Ntrismpioti	20 kilometres walk	—N/a				1:30:19	15
Christina Papadopoulou	20 kilometres walk	—N/a				DNS	
Olga Fiaska	35 kilometres walk	—N/a				DNF	
Kyriaki Filtisakou	35 kilometres walk	—N/a				3:02:16	26
Antigoni Ntrismpioti	35 kilometres walk	—N/a				2:43:22 SB	3rd place, bronze medalist(s)

Field events

Athlete	Event	Qualification		Final	
Athlete	Event	Result	Position	Result	Position
Panagiota Dosi	High jump	1.80	34	Did not advance	
Tatiana Gusin	High jump	1.89	=17	Did not advance	
Eleni-Klaoudia Polak	Pole vault	4.35	28	Did not advance	
Katerina Stefanidi	Pole vault	NM		Did not advance	
Stamatia Skarvelis	Hammer throw	67.53	26	Did not advance	
Elina Tzengko	Javelin throw	54.27	30	Did not advance	
