= Track and field at the 2011 Military World Games – Women's 3000 metres steeplechase =

The women's 3000 metres steeplechase event at the 2011 Military World Games was held on 19 July at the Estádio Olímpico João Havelange.

== Records ==
Prior to this competition, the existing world and CISM record were as follows:

World Record	Gulnara Samitova-Galkina (RUS)	8:58.81	Beijing, China	17 August 2008
CISM World Record				

== Schedule ==
Date	Time	Round
19 July 2011	19:25	Final

== Medalists ==
Gold	Silver	Bronze
Mercy Njoroge; Kenya	Irini Kokkinariou; Greece	Salima El Ouali Alami; Morocco

== Results ==
=== Final ===
Rank	Name	Nationality	Time	Notes
1st place, gold medalist(s)	Mercy Njoroge	Kenya	9:36.92	
2nd place, silver medalist(s)	Irini Kokkinariou	Greece	9:39.53	
3rd place, bronze medalist(s)	Salima El Ouali Alami	Morocco	9:42.51	
4	Sophie Duarte	France	9:45.37	
5	Hajiba Hasnaoui	Morocco	10:32.25	
6	Wpek Dulakshi	Sri Lanka	10:42.01	
	Sabine Heitling	Brazil	DNF	
	Mihaela Prundus-Botezan	Romania	DNS	
