= Athletics at the 2011 Summer Universiade – Women's 20 kilometres walk =

The women's 20 kilometres walk event at the 2011 Summer Universiade was held on 19 August.

== Medalists ==
=== Individual ===
Gold	Silver	Bronze
Julia Takács; Spain	Tatyana Shemyakina; Russia	Nina Okhotnikova; Russia

=== Team ===
Gold	Silver	Bronze
China; Shi Yang; Yang Yawei; Wang Shanshan		

== Results ==
Rank	Name	Nationality	Time	Notes
1st place, gold medalist(s)	Julia Takács	Spain	1:33:51	
2nd place, silver medalist(s)	Tatyana Shemyakina	Russia	1:34:23	
3rd place, bronze medalist(s)	Nina Okhotnikova	Russia	1:35:10	
4	Lucie Pelantová	Czech Republic	1:36:14	
5	Shi Yang	China	1:37:35	
6	Yang Yawei	China	1:39:45	
7	Federica Ferraro	Italy	1:40:40	
8	Agnieszka Szwarnóg	Poland	1:41:21	
9	Wang Shanshan	China	1:41:37	
10	Rebecca Lee	Australia	1:41:54	
11	Zuzana Schindlerová	Czech Republic	1:42:03	
12	Laura Reynolds	Ireland	1:43:27	
13	Mária Czaková	Slovakia	1:43:36	
14	Nicole Fagan	Australia	1:48:02	
15	Erandi Uribe	Mexico	1:48:52	
16	Kumiko Okada	Japan	1:54:07	
	Christin Elss	Germany	DNF	
	Elena Kruchinkina	Russia	DNF	
	Cisiane Lopes	Brazil	DNF	
	Erica Sena	Brazil	DNF	
