= Greece at the 2015 World Championships in Athletics =

- WA code: GRE
- National federation: Hellenic Amateur Athletic Association
- Website: www.segas.gr

in (China) Beijing
- Competitors: 10 in 10 events
- Medals Ranked 32nd: Gold 0 Silver 0 Bronze 1 Total 1

World Championships in Athletics appearances (overview)
- 1983; 1987; 1991; 1993; 1995; 1997; 1999; 2001; 2003; 2005; 2007; 2009; 2011; 2013; 2015; 2017; 2019; 2022; 2023; 2025

Greece competed at the 2015 World Championships in Athletics in Beijing, China, from 22–30 August 2015. A team of 10 athletes, 5 men and 5 women, represented the country in a total of 10 events.

== Medalists ==
Medal	Athlete	Event	Notes
Bronze	Nikoleta Kyriakopoulou	Pole vault	4.80 m

== Results ==
(q – qualified, NM – no mark, SB – season best)

=== Men ===
Track and road events

Athlete	Event	Heat		Semifinal		Final	
Athlete	Event	Result	Rank	Result	Rank	Result	Rank
Lykourgos-Stefanos Tsakonas	200 metres	20.14	4 Q	20.22	11	did not advance	
Konstadinos Douvalidis	110 metres hurdles	13.58	23 q	13.79	24	did not advance	
Alexandros Papamichail	20 kilometres walk	—N/a				1:24:11	25
Alexandros Papamichail	50 kilometres walk	—N/a				DNF	

Field events

Athlete	Event	Qualification		Final	
Athlete	Event	Distance	Position	Distance	Position
Konstadinos Baniotis	High jump	2.31 SB	8 Q	2.20	14
Konstadinos Filippidis	Pole vault	5.55	25	did not advance	

=== Women ===
Track and road events

Athlete	Event	Heat		Semifinal		Final	
Athlete	Event	Result	Rank	Result	Rank	Result	Rank
Maria Belibasaki	200 metres	23.15	24 q	23.28	23	did not advance	

Field events

Athlete	Event	Qualification		Final	
Athlete	Event	Distance	Position	Distance	Position
Nikoleta Kyriakopoulou	Pole vault	4.55	1 q	4.80	3rd place, bronze medalist(s)
Ekaterini Stefanidi	Pole vault	4.45	15	did not advance	
Chrysoula Anagnostopoulou	Discus throw	58.20	23	did not advance	

Combined events – Heptathlon

Athlete	Event	100H	HJ	SP	200 m	LJ	JT	800 m	Final	Rank
Sofia Yfantidou	Result	13.77 SB	1.68 SB	12.94	25.93	5.75	56.19	2:19.55	5951	19
Sofia Yfantidou	Points	1011	830	723	803	774	980	830	5951	19
