= Greece at the 2001 World Championships in Athletics =

- WA code: GRE
- National federation: Hellenic Amateur Athletic Association
- Website: www.segas.gr

in (Canada) Edmonton
- Competitors: 26
- Medals Ranked 15th: Gold 1 Silver 2 Bronze 2 Total 5

World Championships in Athletics appearances (overview)
- 1983; 1987; 1991; 1993; 1995; 1997; 1999; 2001; 2003; 2005; 2007; 2009; 2011; 2013; 2015; 2017; 2019; 2022; 2023; 2025

Greece participated with a team of 26 athletes (10 men, 16 women) at the 2001 World Championships in Athletics in Edmonton, Alberta, Canada.

== Medals ==
Medal	Name	Event	Notes
Gold	Konstantinos Kenteris	Men's 200 metres	20.04 s
Silver	Mirela Manjani	Women's javelin throw	65.78 m
Silver	Ekaterini Thanou	Women's 100 metres	10.91 s
Bronze	Anastasia Kelesidou	Women's discus throw	65.50 m SB
Bronze	Konstadinos Gatsioudis	Men's javelin throw	89.95 m

== Results ==
Name	Event	Place	Notes
Niki Xanthou	Women's long jump	6th	6.76 m
Aggeliki Tsiolakoudi	Women's javelin throw	8th	61.01 m
Athina Papayianni	Women's 20 kilometres walk	11th	1:34:56
Konstadinos Zalaggitis	Men's triple jump	12th	16.13 m

== See also ==
- Greece at the IAAF World Championships in Athletics
