= Greece at the 2005 World Championships in Athletics =

- WA code: GRE
- National federation: Hellenic Amateur Athletic Association
- Website: www.segas.gr

in (Finland) Helsinki
- Competitors: 24
- Medals: Gold 0 Silver 0 Bronze 0 Total 0

World Championships in Athletics appearances (overview)
- 1983; 1987; 1991; 1993; 1995; 1997; 1999; 2001; 2003; 2005; 2007; 2009; 2011; 2013; 2015; 2017; 2019; 2022; 2023; 2025

Greece was represented by 24 athletes at the 2005 World Championships in Athletics in Helsinki, Finland without winning any medals. The best results of the team were Hrysopiyi Devetzi' s 5th place in triple jump and Athina Papayianni finishing 6th in 20 km walk race.

== Results ==
Name	Event	Place	Notes
Hrysopiyi Devetzi	Women's triple jump	5th	14.64 m
Athina Papayianni	Women's 20 kilometres walk	6th	1:29:21 SB
Aggeliki Tsiolakoudi	Women's javelin throw	8th	57.99 m
Maria Karastamati	Women's 100 metres	10th (sf)	11.20 s
Alexandros Papadimitriou	Men's hammer throw	10th (q)	74.99 m

== See also ==
- Greece at the IAAF World Championships in Athletics
