= Greece at the 2011 World Championships in Athletics =

- WA code: GRE
- National federation: Hellenic Amateur Athletic Association
- Website: www.segas.gr

in (South Korea) Daegu
- Competitors: 12
- Medals: Gold 0 Silver 0 Bronze 0 Total 0

World Championships in Athletics appearances (overview)
- 1983; 1987; 1991; 1993; 1995; 1997; 1999; 2001; 2003; 2005; 2007; 2009; 2011; 2013; 2015; 2017; 2019; 2022; 2023; 2025

Greece competed at the 2011 World Championships in Athletics from August 27 to September 4 in Daegu, South Korea. A team of 12 athletes (7 men and 5 women) represented the country in the event.

== Results ==
=== Men ===
Athlete	Event	Preliminaries		Heats		Semifinals		Final	
Athlete	Event	Time Width Height	Rank	Time Width Height	Rank	Time Width Height	Rank	Time Width Height	Rank
Konstadinos Douvalidis	110 m hurdles			13.59	19	did not advance			
Louis Tsatoumas	Long jump	8.01	14					did not advance	
Dimitrios Chondrokoukis	High jump	2.31	1					2.32	5
Konstadinos Baniotis	High jump	2.28	15					did not advance	
Konstadinos Filippidis	Pole vault	5.65	1					5.75	6
Yervásios Filippídis	Javelin throw	76.66	21					did not advance	
Spirídon Lebésis	Javelin throw	73.35	30					did not advance	

=== Women ===
Athlete	Event	Preliminaries		Heats		Semifinals		Final	
Athlete	Event	Time Width Height	Rank	Time Width Height	Rank	Time Width Height	Rank	Time Width Height	Rank
Iríni Kokkinaríou	3000 metres steeplechase			10:15.18	32			did not advance	
Paraskeví Papahrístou	Triple jump	14.05	16					did not advance	
Níki Panéta	Triple jump	13.97	20					did not advance	
Nikoléta Kiriakopoúlou	Pole vault	4.55	10					4.65	8
Alexándra Papayeoryíou	Hammer throw	66.77	22					did not advance	

== See also ==
- Greece at the IAAF World Championships in Athletics
