= Greece at the 2003 World Championships in Athletics =

- WA code: GRE
- National federation: Hellenic Amateur Athletic Association
- Website: www.segas.gr

in (France) Paris
- Competitors: 45
- Medals Ranked 10th: Gold 1 Silver 1 Bronze 3 Total 5

World Championships in Athletics appearances (overview)
- 1983; 1987; 1991; 1993; 1995; 1997; 1999; 2001; 2003; 2005; 2007; 2009; 2011; 2013; 2015; 2017; 2019; 2022; 2023; 2025

Greece was represented by -a record number of- 45 athletes at the 2003 World Championships in Athletics in Paris, France.

== Medals ==
Medal	Name	Event	Notes
Gold	Mirela Manjani	Women's javelin throw	66.52 WL
Silver	Anastasia Kelesidou	Women's discus throw	67.14 SB
Bronze	Ekaterini Voggoli	Women's discus throw	66.73 PB
Bronze	Periklis Iakovakis	Men's 400 metres hurdles	48.24
Bronze	Ekaterini Thanou	Women's 100 metres	11.03 s

== Results ==
Name	Event	Place	Notes
Periklis Iakovakis; Stilianos Dimotsios; Anastasios Gousis; Panagiotis Sarris	Men's 4 × 400 m relay	6th	3:02.56
Athanasia Tsoumeleka	Women's 20 km walk	7th	1:29:34 NR
Christos Meletoglou	Men's triple jump	7th	16.92 m
Alexandros Papadimitriou	Men's hammer throw	8th	77.79 m
Hrysopiyi Devetzi	Women's triple jump	8th	14.34 m =PB
Argyro Strataki	Women's heptathlon	9th	6077
Olga Vasdeki	Women's triple jump	12th	14.08 m
Irini Terzoglou	Women's shot put	12th	17.88 m
Louis Tsatoumas	Men's long jump	12th	7.72 m

== See also ==
- Greece at the IAAF World Championships in Athletics
