= Raquel González (athlete) =

Spanish racewalker

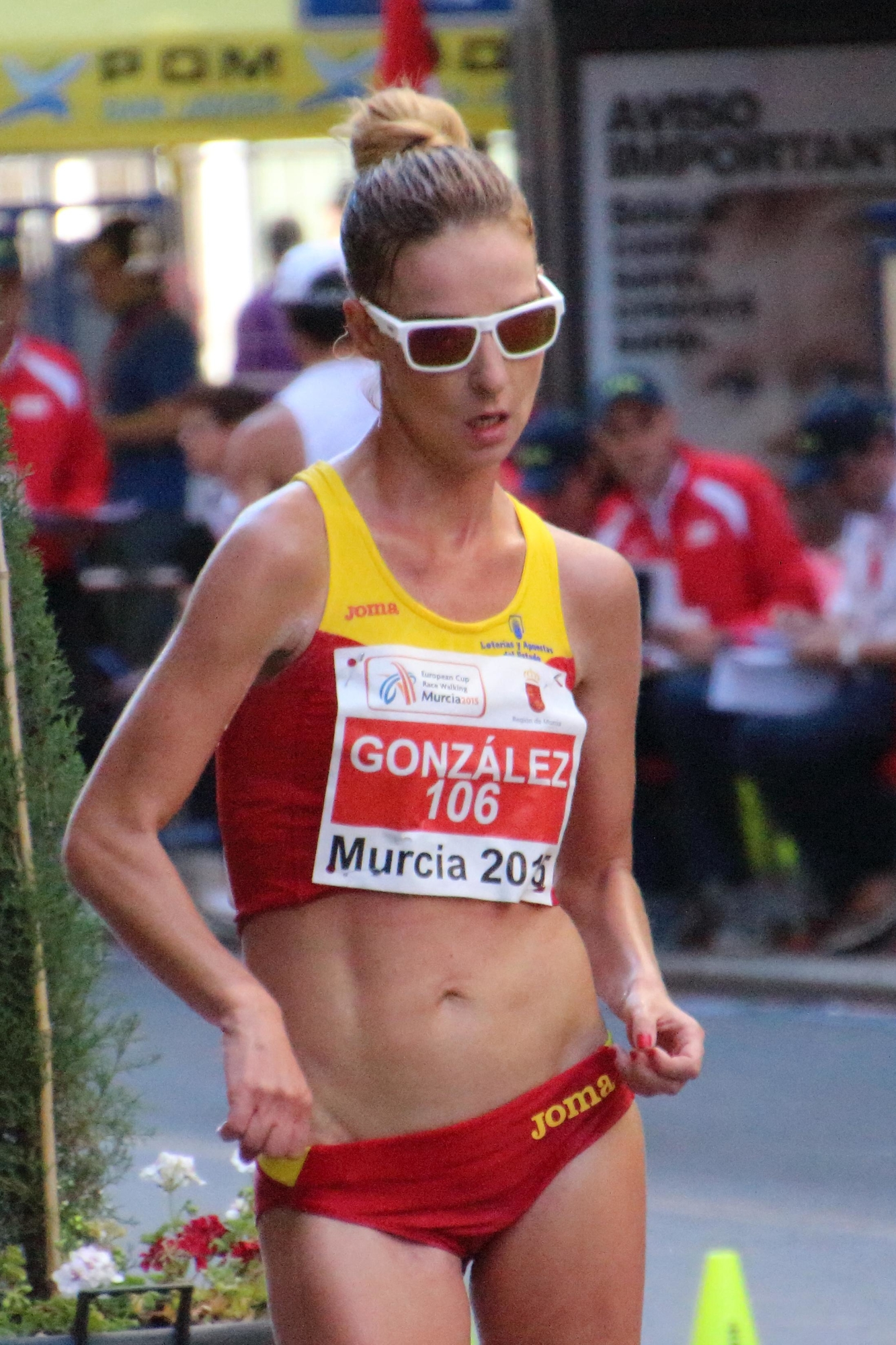

Personal information
- Full name: Raquel González Campos
- Nationality: Spanish
- Born: 16 November 1989 (age 36) Mataró, Catalonia, Spain
- Height: 176 cm (5 ft 9 in)
- Weight: 48 kg (106 lb)

Sport
- Country: Spain
- Sport: Track and field
Medal record
Women's athletics
Representing Spain
European Championships
Silver medal – second place	2022 Munich	35 km walk
Bronze medal – third place	2026 Birmingham	Marathon walk

Raquel González Campos (born 16 November 1989) is an Olympic athlete from Spain and represents Futbol Club Barcelona. She competed in the Women's 20 kilometres walk event at the Olympic Games in Rio de Janeiro (Brazil) 2016 and 2015 World Championships in Athletics in Beijing, China and World Championship 2019 in Doha, Qatar. She's bronze medal in European Cup 20 km racewalker, Alytus 2019 and Top 8 World Ranking 50 km racewalker, 2019.

== Competition record ==
Year	Competition	Venue	Position	Event	Notes
Representing Spain
2007	European Junior Championships	Hengelo, Netherlands	11th	10,000 m walk	50:10
2008	World Junior Championships	Bydgoszcz, Poland	21st	10,000 m walk	48:53
2009	European U23 Championships	Kaunas, Lithuania	8th	20 km walk	1:38:00
2011	European U23 Championships	Ostrava, Czech Republic	13th	20 km walk	1:45:46
2013	Mediterranean Games	Mersin, Turkey	2nd	20 km walk	1:41:08
2014	World Race Walking Cup	Taicang, China	13th	20 km walk	1:28:36
2014	European Championships	Zurich, Switzerland	10th	20 km walk	1:30:03
2015	World Championships	Beijing, China	14th	20 km walk	1:32:00
2016	World Race Walking Cup	Rome, Italy	9th	20 km walk	1.29:01
2016	Olympic Games	Rio de Janeiro, Brazil	20th	20 km walk	1:33:03
2018	World Race Walking Championships	Taicang, China	19th	20 km walk	1:31:01
2018	European Athletics Championships	Berlin, Germany	12th	20 km walk	1:31:48
2019	World Championships	Doha, Qatar	15th	20 km walk	1:38:02
2021	Olympic Games	Sapporo, Japan	14th	20 km walk	1:31:57
2022	World Race Walking Championships	Muscat, Oman	11th	35 km walk	3:02:44
2022	World Championships	Eugene, United States	5th	35 km walk	2:42:27
2022	European Athletics Championships	Munich, Germany	2nd	35 km walk	2:49:10

== See also ==
- Spain at the 2015 World Championships in Athletics
- Spanish Record Holder 10 km racewalker 42:14
- Spanish Record Holder 50 km racewalker 4:11:01
- Spain Bronze Medal Team at the World Racewalking Cup, Taicang (China) 2018
- Bronze Medal European Cup 20 km racewalker, Alytus 2019
