= 2011 European Athletics U23 Championships – Women's 20 kilometres walk =

Women's 20 kilometres walk

The women's 20 kilometres walk event at the 2011 European Athletics U23 Championships was held in Ostrava, Czech Republic, at Městský stadion on 17 July.

== Medalists ==
Gold	Nina Okhotnikova; Russia
Silver	Julia Takács; Spain
Bronze	Antonella Palmisano; Italy

== Results ==
=== Final ===
17 July 2011 / 10:00

Rank	Name	Nationality	Time	Notes
1st place, gold medalist(s)	Nina Okhotnikova	Russia	1:31:51	
2nd place, silver medalist(s)	Julia Takács	Spain	1:31:55	
3rd place, bronze medalist(s)	Antonella Palmisano	Italy	1:36:26	
4	Eleonora Giorgi	Italy	1:38:41	
5	Anita Kažemāka	Latvia	1:38:59	
6	Katarzyna Golba	Poland	1:39:36	
7	Emilie Menuet	France	1:41:52	
8	Georgiana Enache	Romania	1:43:56	PB
9	Magdalena Jasińska	Poland	1:44:18	
10	Christin Elß	Germany	1:44:27	
11	Inga Mastianica	Lithuania	1:44:44	
12	Alexandra Gradinariu	Romania	1:44:59	
13	Raquel González	Spain	1:45:46	
14	Kristine Platace	Latvia	1:48:48	
15	Eszter Bajnai	Hungary	1:51:36	
16	Daniela Cardoso	Portugal	1:56:02	
	Mikaela Löfbacka	Finland	DNF	
	Agata Litwiniuk	Poland	DQ	R 230.6
	Anna Lukyanova	Russia	DQ	R 230.6
	Tatyana Mineyeva	Russia	DQ	R 32.2.b Doping^{†}

^{†}: Tatyana Mineyeva ranked initially 1st (1:31:42), but was disqualified later for infringement of IAAF doping rules.

Intermediate times:
2 km: 10:21 Alexandra Gradinariu Romania
4 km: 19:48 Tatyana Mineyeva Russia
6 km: 28:55 Nina Okhotnikova Russia
8 km: 37:48 Nina Okhotnikova Russia
10 km: 46:42 Nina Okhotnikova Russia
12 km: 55:31 Nina Okhotnikova Russia
14 km: 1:04:30 Nina Okhotnikova Russia
16 km: 1:13:32 Tatyana Mineyeva Russia
18 km: 1:22:25 Tatyana Mineyeva Russia

== Participation ==
According to an unofficial count, 20 athletes from 12 countries participated in the event.

- Finland (1)
- France (1)
- Germany (1)
- Hungary (1)
- Italy (2)
- Latvia (2)
- Lithuania (1)
- Poland (3)
- Portugal (1)
- Romania (2)
- Russia (3)
- Spain (2)
