= Greece at the 2007 World Championships in Athletics =

- WA code: GRE
- National federation: Hellenic Amateur Athletic Association
- Website: www.segas.gr

in (Japan) Osaka
- Competitors: 27
- Medals: Gold 0 Silver 0 Bronze 0 Total 0

World Championships in Athletics appearances (overview)
- 1983; 1987; 1991; 1993; 1995; 1997; 1999; 2001; 2003; 2005; 2007; 2009; 2011; 2013; 2015; 2017; 2019; 2022; 2023; 2025

Greece participated with a team of 27 athletes (15 women and 12 men) at the 2007 World Championships in Athletics in Osaka, Japan.

== Medals ==
Medal	Name	Event	Notes
~~Bronze~~	Hrysopiyi Devetzi	Women's triple jump	~~15.04~~ DSQ

== Results ==
Name	Event	Place	Notes
Savva Lika	Women's javelin throw	5th	63.13 PB
Periklis Iakovakis	Men's 400 metres hurdles	6th	49.25
Anastasios Gousis	Men's 200 metres	8th	20.75
Dimitrios Tsiamis	Men's triple jump	12th	16.59

== See also ==
- Greece at the IAAF World Championships in Athletics
