= Greece at the 1999 World Championships in Athletics =

- WA code: GRE
- National federation: Hellenic Amateur Athletic Association
- Website: www.segas.gr

in (Spain) Seville
- Competitors: 42
- Medals Ranked 4th: Gold 2 Silver 2 Bronze 2 Total 6

World Championships in Athletics appearances (overview)
- 1983; 1987; 1991; 1993; 1995; 1997; 1999; 2001; 2003; 2005; 2007; 2009; 2011; 2013; 2015; 2017; 2019; 2022; 2023; 2025

Greece participated at the 1999 World Championships in Athletics in Seville, Spain with a team of 42 athletes (24 men, 18 women). The team won 6 medals and ended up in the 4th place of the Championships, achieving the best results in the history of Greek athletics.

== Medals ==
Medal	Name	Event	Notes
Gold	Paraskevi Tsiamita	Women's triple jump	14.88
Gold	Mirela Manjani	Women's javelin throw	67.09 PB
Silver	Anastasia Kelesidou	Women's discus throw	66.05
Silver	Konstadinos Gatsioudis	Men's javelin throw	89.18
Bronze	Ekaterini Thanou	Women's 100 metres	10.84
Bronze	Olga Vasdeki	Women's triple jump	14.61

== Results ==
Name	Event	Place	Notes
Christos Polychroniou	Men's hammer throw	6th	78.31 m
Styliani Tsikouna	Women's discus throw	8th	63.43 m
Ekaterini Voggoli	Women's discus throw	11th	61.00 m

== See also ==
- Greece at the IAAF World Championships in Athletics
