= 2009 European Athletics U23 Championships – Women's 20 kilometres walk =

The women's 20 kilometres race walk event at the 2009 European Athletics U23 Championships was held in Kaunas, Lithuania, on 17 July.

== Medalists ==
Gold	Olena Shumkina; Russia
Silver	Zuzana Schindlerová; Czech Republic
Bronze	Tatyana Shemyakina; Russia

== Results ==
=== Final ===
17 July

Rank	Name	Nationality	Time	Notes
1st place, gold medalist(s)	Olena Shumkina	Russia	1:33:05	
2nd place, silver medalist(s)	Zuzana Schindlerová	Czech Republic	1:33:42	
3rd place, bronze medalist(s)	Tatyana Shemyakina	Russia	1:34:13	
4	Olha Yakovenko	Ukraine	1:36:24	
5	Julia Takács	Spain	1:36:49	
6	Agnese Pastare	Latvia	1:36:59	
7	Karoliina Kaasalainen	Finland	1:37:36	
8	Raquel González	Spain	1:38:00	
9	Anamaria Greceanu	Romania	1:38:20	
10	Federica Ferraro	Italy	1:38:56	
11	Eleonora Giorgi	Italy	1:39:42	
12	Katarzyna Golba	Poland	1:39:59	
13	Lucyna Chruściel	Poland	1:40:15	
14	Mária Czaková	Slovakia	1:41:47	
15	Laura Reynolds	Ireland	1:43:07	
16	Inga Mastianica	Latvia	1:47:37	
17	Rita Kaselytė	Lithuania	1:47:54	
18	Valerija Lišakova	Lithuania	1:51:25	
	Hanna Drabenia	Belarus	DQ	Rule 230.6
	Alba Sánchez	Spain	DQ	Rule 230.6

== Participation ==
According to an unofficial count, 20 athletes from 13 countries participated in the event.

- Belarus (1)
- Czech Republic (1)
- Finland (1)
- Ireland (1)
- Italy (2)
- Latvia (2)
- Lithuania (2)
- Poland (2)
- Romania (1)
- Russia (2)
- Slovakia (1)
- Spain (3)
- Ukraine (1)
