= 2026 European Athletics Championships – Women's marathon race walk =

Women's marathon race walk at the 2026 European Athletics Championships
- Venue: Alexander Stadium
- Location: Birmingham, United Kingdom
- Dates: 15 August 2026
- Winning time: 3:15:11 WR

Medalists
gold medal	Sofia Fiorini	Italy
silver medal	Katarzyna Zdziebło	Poland
bronze medal	Raquel González	Spain

The women's marathon race walk at the 2026 European Athletics Championships took place in Birmingham, United Kingdom, on 15 August 2026.

== Background ==
Records before the 2026 European Athletics Championships
Record	Athlete (nation)	Time	Location	Date
World record	Katarzyna Zdziebło (POL)	3:24:19	Zittau, Germany	25 October 2025
World leading	Paula Milena Torres (ECU)	3:24:37	Brasilia, Brazil	12 April 2026
Championship record	New event			
European record	Katarzyna Zdziebło (POL)	3:24:19	Zittau, Germany	25 October 2025
European leading	Sofia Fiorini (ITA)	3:25:42	Brasilia, Brazil	12 April 2026

== Qualification ==
The qualification period was from 27 January 2025 to 26 July 2026. Athletes qualified by the entry standard of 3:40:00 m or faster in marathon race walk, by the entry standard of 2:57:00 in 35 km walk, by wildcard for the 2022 European Athletics Championor (in 2024 the event was not run), or by their position on the World Athletics Rankings for the event. The target number was 35 athletes. Eventually only 21 athletes qualified.

Qualification standings per 31 July 2026
QP	CP	Country	Athlete	Status	Details
1	1	Greece	Antigoni Ntrismpioti	Qualified by Wild Card	Defending European Champion
2	1	Poland	Katarzyna Zdziebło	Qualified by Entry Standard	3:24:19 - Weinauparkstadion, Zittau (GER) - 25 OCT 2025
3	1	Italy	Sofia Fiorini	Qualified by Entry Standard	3:25:42 - Brasilia (BRA) - 12 APR 2026
4	2	Italy	Federica Curiazzi	Qualified by Entry Standard	3:32:21 - Brasilia (BRA) - 12 APR 2026
5	1	France	Camille Moutard	Qualified by Entry Standard	3:33:38 - Salaise-sur-Sanne (FRA) - 16 NOV 2025
6	3	Italy	Eleonora Anna Giorgi	Qualified by Entry Standard	3:35:46 - Brasilia (BRA) - 12 APR 2026
7	2	Greece	Panagiota Tsinopoulou	Qualified by Entry Standard	3:38:13 - Izmir (TUR) - 14 MAR 2026
8	1	Spain	Laura Monje Martínez	Qualified by Entry Standard	3:39:11 - Dudince (SVK) - 07 MAR 2026
9	1	Ukraine	Hanna Shevchuk	Qualified by Entry Standard	2:42:41 - Lázeňský Park, Poděbrady (CZE) - 18 MAY 2025
10	2	Spain	Raquel González	Qualified by Entry Standard	2:45:41 - National Stadium, Tokyo (JPN) - 13 SEP 2025
11	3	Spain	Lucía Redondo	Qualified by Entry Standard	2:51:37 - Marín (ESP) - 09 MAR 2025
12	1	Germany	Bianca Maria Dittrich	Qualified by World Rankings	16th - 1077 points
13	3	Greece	Olga Fiaska	Qualified by World Rankings	19th - 1056 points
14	2	Poland	Anna Zdziebło	Qualified by World Rankings	20th - 1050 points
15	1	Turkey	Ayşe Aslan	Qualified by World Rankings	23rd - 1031 points
16	2	Germany	Ada Junghannß	Qualified by World Rankings	24th - 1023 points
17	1	Portugal	Joana Pontes	Qualified by World Rankings	25th - 1017 points
18	3	Poland	Kinga Waleriańczyk	Qualified by World Rankings	26th - 1016 points
reserve	4	Italy	Sara Vitiello	Qualified by World Rankings	28th - 1005 points
reserve	5	Italy	Lidia Barcella	Qualified by World Rankings	29th - 995 points
19	2	Turkey	Kader Güvenç	Qualified by World Rankings	30th - 991 points
20	4	Greece	Efstathia Kourkoutsaki	Qualified by World Rankings	31st - 927 points
21	3	Turkey	Esma Öztekın	Qualified by World Rankings	33rd - 888 points

== Schedule ==
Date	Time	Round
15 August 2026	7:30	Final

All times are local times (UTC+1)

== Results ==
Key:	~ Red card for loss of contact	> Red card for bent knee

Place	Athlete	Nation	Time	Red cards	Notes
1st place, gold medalist(s)	Sofia Fiorini	Italy	3:15:11		WR
2nd place, silver medalist(s)	Katarzyna Zdziebło	Poland	3:19:50		NR
3rd place, bronze medalist(s)	Raquel González	Spain	3:20:49		PB
4	Antigoni Drisbioti	Greece	3:22:16	> >	NR
5	Panayiota Tsinopoulou	Greece	3:25:14		PB
6	Hanna Shevchuk	Ukraine	3:26:02		PB
7	Lucía Redondo	Spain	3:28:28		PB
8	Camille Moutard	France	3:31:56		PB
9	Ada Junghannß	Germany	3:40:37		PB
10	Joana Pontes	Portugal	3:41:36		NR
11	Laura Monje Martínez	Spain	3:42:01		
12	Anna Zdziebło	Poland	3:42:08		PB
13	Ayşe Tekdal	Turkey	3:43:29	~	NR
14	Kinga Waleriańczyk	Poland	3:43:58		PB
15	Efstathia Kourkoutsaki	Greece	3:51:36		PB
16	Esma Özteki̇n	Turkey	4:04:59	>	PB
—	Bianca Maria Dittrich	Germany	DNF	>	
—	Eleonora Giorgi	Italy	DNF	> >	
—	Olga Fiaska	Greece	DNF		
—	Federica Curiazzi	Italy	DNF		
—	Kader Güvenç	Turkey	DQ	> > > >	TR54.7.5
