= Júlia Takács =

Spanish race walker

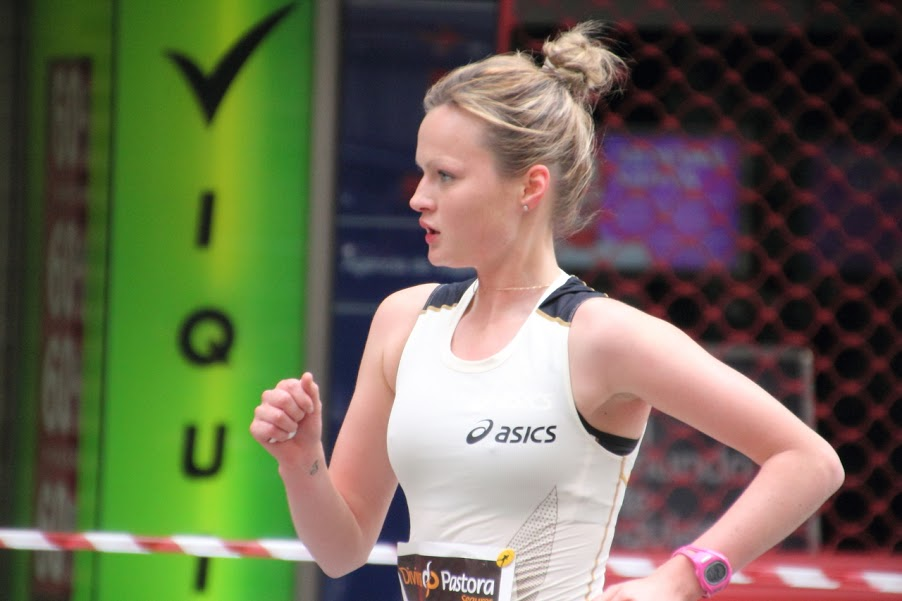
- Takács in 2013

Personal information
- Full name: Julia Takács Nyerges
- Born: 29 June 1989 (age 37) Budapest, Hungary
- Height: 171 cm (5 ft 7 in)

Sport
- Country: Spain
- Sport: Track and field
- Event(s): 20 km race walk, 50 km race walk
Medal record
European Cup
Silver medal – second place	2009 Metz	20 km team

Julia Takács Nyerges (born 29 June 1989) is a Hungarian-born Spanish race walker. She competed in the women's 20 kilometres walk event at the 2016 Summer Olympics. Takács was born in Budapest, Hungary, and acquired Spanish citizenship on 20 June 2008.

== Competition record ==
Year	Competition	Venue	Position	Event	Notes
Representing Spain
2008	World Junior Championships	Bydgoszcz, Poland	6th	10,000 m	45:58
2009	European Race Walking Cup	Metz, France	11th	20 km	1:37:01
2009	European U23 Championships	Kaunas, Lithuania	5th	20 km	1:36:49
2010	World Race Walking Cup	Chihuahua, Mexico	26th	20 km	1:40:58
2010	Ibero-American Championships	San Fernando, Spain	2nd	10,000 m	43:35
2011	European Race Walking Cup	Olhão, Portugal	10th	20 km	1:33:09
2011	European U23 Championships	Ostrava, Czech Republic	1st	20 km	1:31:55
2011	Universiade	Shenzhen, China	1st	20 km	1:33:51
2012	World Race Walking Cup	Saransk, Russia	10th	20 km	1:32:05
2013	European Race Walking Cup	Dudince, Slovakia	22nd	20 km	1:37:22
2013	World Championships	Moscow, Russia	9th	20 km	1:29:25
2014	World Race Walking Cup	Taicang, China	29th	20 km	1:30:43
2015	European Race Walking Cup	Murcia, Spain	DQ	20 km	DNF
2016	World Race Walking Cup	Rome, Italy	13th	20 km	1:29:47
2016	Olympic Games	Rio de Janeiro, Brazil	33rd	20 km	1:33:45
2018	World Race Walking Cup	Taicang, China	8th	50 km	4:16:37
2018	European Athletics Championships	Berlin, Germany	2nd	50 km	4:15:22
2018	Ibero-American Championships	Trujillo, Peru	5th	10,000 m	45:15
2019	World Championships	Doha, Qatar	8th	50 km	4:38:20
