= IAAF Race Walking Challenge Final =

Annual international racewalking competition

- Sport: Racewalking
- Founded: 2007
- Ceased: 2012
- Qualification: IAAF Race Walking Challenge

The IAAF Race Walking Challenge Final was an annual racewalking competition organised by the International Association of Athletics Federations (IAAF). It served as the culmination of the IAAF Race Walking Challenge series from 2007 to 2012. It featured a men's and a women's 20 kilometres race walk. Any athlete could compete at the final, though to be eligible for the series prize money pot of US$202,000 a minimum of four finishes at Race Walking Challenge meetings held that year was required. If the points winner of the Race Walking Challenge series did not compete at the final, their prize money was halved.

At the first final in 2007 Russia's Vladimir Kanaykin broke the men's world record with a time of 1:17:16 hours while his compatriot Olga Kaniskina took the women's race with the best time of the season (1:26:47). Neither was eligible for the series title. Spain's Paquillo Fernández and Portuguese Susana Feitor won the 2008 final, but again neither topped the overall ranking. The 2009 final was amended to a 10 kilometres race walk format and home Russian athletes Andrey Ruzavin (38:17) and Tatyana Mineyeva (42:04) set world under-20 and European under-20 records on the way to their victories (again, neither was a series winner).

The 10 km format continued from the fourth final in 2010 onwards and again the races were won by non-series winners (Wang Zhen and Tatyana Sibileva). At the fifth final in 2011 Russia's Valeriy Borchin and Olga Kaniskina became the first athletes to win both the final race and the overall series, a feat which was repeated by Wang Zhen and Liu Hong at the sixth and last edition of the final.

Kaniskina and Wang were the only athletes to win the final on multiple occasions. Russia had the most success, taking seven of the twelve men's and women's titles, followed by China with three winners. The final format was removed for the 2013 IAAF Race Walking Challenge, as the series changed focus to incorporate international championships into the point-scoring circuit.

== Editions ==
Edition	Year	Date	City	Country	Men's winner	Women's winner	Ref.
1	2007	29 September	Saransk	Russia	Vladimir Kanaykin (RUS)	Olga Kaniskina (RUS)	
2	2008	21 September	Murcia	Spain	Paquillo Fernández (ESP)	Susana Feitor (POR)	
3	2009	19 September	Saransk	Russia	Andrey Ruzavin (RUS)	Tatyana Mineyeva (RUS)	
4	2010	18 September	Beijing	China	Wang Zhen (CHN)	Tatyana Sibileva (RUS)	
5	2011	17 September	A Coruña	Spain	Valeriy Borchin (RUS)	Olga Kaniskina (RUS)	
6	2012	14 September	Ordos City	China	Wang Zhen (CHN)	Liu Hong (CHN)	
