= Natalya Shevtsova =

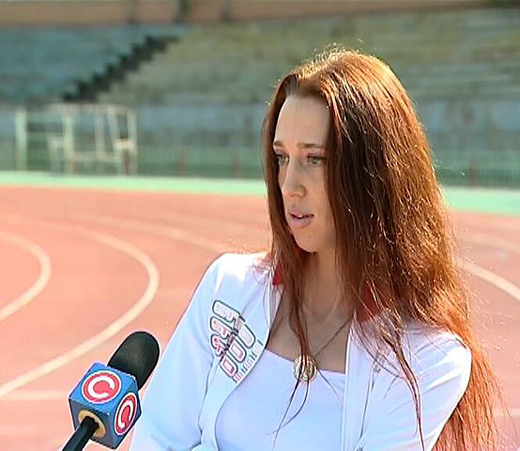
- Natalia Tshevtsova granting an interview

Personal information
- Born: 17 December 1974 (age 51)

Achievements and titles
- National finals: 1997 Russian Champs; • 400 m, 5th; 1998 Russian Champs; • 400 m, 6th; 2001 Russian Champs; • 400 m, 4th
Medal record
Women's athletics
Representing Russia
IAAF World Championships
Bronze medal – third place	2001 Edmonton	4×400 m relay
Summer Universiade
Gold medal – first place	1997 Catania	4x400 m relay

Natalya Shevtsova (born 17 December 1974) was a professional sprinter from Russia. She won a bronze medal at the 2001 IAAF World Championships in the 4 × 400 m relay event by virtue of running for her team in the preliminary rounds.

She also came in fourth place at the 2001 Goodwill Games in the same event, this time running in the final.

== Major international competitions ==
Year	Competition	Venue	Position	Event	Notes
2001	IAAF World Championships in Athletics	Edmonton, Canada	3rd (Heat 2, Heats)	4 × 400 m	3:27.39

== Domestic competitions ==
Year	Competition	Venue	Position	Event	Notes
2002	Russia Championships	Cheboksary, Russia	4th (Heat 1, Semifinals)	400 m	52.17
2003	Russia Championships	Tula, Russia	6th (Heat 3, Semifinals)	400 m	53.65
2004	Russia Championships	Tula, Russia	5th (Heat 1, Semifinals)	400 m	51.73
