= Tatyana Mineyeva =

Russian racewalker (born 1990)

Personal information
- Born: 10 August 1990 (age 36)
- Height: 1.54 m (5 ft 1 in)

Sport
- Country: Russia
- Sport: Racewalking
- Event: 20 kilometres race walk
- Retired: 2017

Achievements and titles
- Personal best: 20 km walk: 1:28:09 (2011)

Tatyana Nikolaevna Mineyeva (Russian: Татьяна Николаевна Минеева; born 10 August 1990) is a Russian female former racewalking athlete. She won age category titles at international level, including the World Junior Championships in 2008, the European Race Walking Cup in 2009, and the European Athletics U23 Championships in 2011. She won a 20 kilometres race walk national title in 2011 and represented her country at senior level at the 2011 World Championships in Athletics and 2010 IAAF World Race Walking Cup. She won the 2009 IAAF Race Walking Challenge Final race.

Mineyeva was banned from competition for two years for a doping infraction. She was part of Viktor Chegin's training group, which was connected to numerous doping cases in Russia.

== Career ==
From Mordovia, she took up racewalking at age 14 and began competing in national level racewalking competitions in Russia in 2006. Initially working with coach Vadim Kabanov she later moved to Viktor Chegin's group, which featured many national level walkers. She had her breakthrough in 2008, first winning the junior 10 km title at the Russian Race Walking Championships, then taking the gold medal at the 2008 World Junior Championships in Athletics. Mineyeva went undefeated in the 2009 season – first she won the 10 km junior race at the Russian Winter Race Walking Championships, followed by an individual and team victory in the junior race at the 2009 European Race Walking Cup, and finishing with senior level wins in Penza and the 2009 IAAF Race Walking Challenge Final.

Mineyeva entered the senior ranks in 2010 and placed fourth in the 20 kilometres race walk at the Russian Winter Championships and 44th at that distance at the 2010 IAAF World Race Walking Cup. The following year she was eighth at the Winter Championships before going on to win her first national title at the main Russian Championships in Saransk. A gold medal at the 2011 European Athletics U23 Championships followed a month later. As a result, she was chosen for the Russian team for the 2011 World Championships in Athletics, where she finished 17th (later upgraded to 14th).

Mineyeva finished ninth at the Russian Winter Championships at the start of 2012 but missed the rest of the season, which closed with a two-year doping ban due to abnormal haemoglobin levels in her blood sample. Sergey Morozov, another internationally successful walker training under Viktor Chegin, was banned at the same time and this marked the start of a period of repeated doping infractions within the training group, and within the country in general.

By the time of her return to the sport in 2015, doping in Russia had built into a problem so large that her country was banned from international competition at the end of the year. As a result, Mineyeva was limited to national competitions only and she retired from the sport in 2017 after three years of failing to reach the national podium.

== International competitions ==
Year	Competition	Venue	Position	Event	Notes
2008	World Junior Championships	Bydgoszcz, Poland	1st	10,000 m walk	43:24.72
2009	European Race Walking Cup	Metz, France	1st	10 km junior	44:16
2009	European Race Walking Cup	Metz, France	1st	10 km junior	3 pts
2010	World Race Walking Cup	Chihuahua City, Mexico	44th	20 km walk	1:47:05
2010	World Race Walking Cup	Chihuahua City, Mexico	4th	Team	33 pts
2011	European U23 Championships	Ostrava, Czech Republic	1st	20 km walk	1:31:42
2011	World Championships	Daegu, South Korea	17th	20 km walk	1:34:08

== National titles ==
- Russian Race Walking Championships
  - 20 km walk: 2011

== Circuit wins ==
- IAAF Race Walking Challenge Final
  - 10 km walk: 2009

== See also ==
- List of doping cases in athletics
