= List of Greek records in athletics =

The following are the national records in athletics in Greece maintained by Greece's national athletics federation: Hellenic Amateur Athletic Association (SEGAS).

== Outdoor ==
Key to tables: Awaiting ratification Record not kept by SEGAS Not ratified or later rescinded by SEGAS

=== Men ===
Event	Record	Athlete	Date	Meet	Place	Ref.
100 m	10.11 (+1.4 m/s)	Angelos Pavlakakis	2 August 1997	World Championships	Athens, Greece	
150 m (straight)	15.04 (+0.4 m/s)	Lykourgos-Stefanos Tsakonas	26 May 2017	Great CityGames Manchester	Manchester, United Kingdom	
200 m	19.85 (−0.5 m/s)	Konstantinos Kenteris	9 August 2002	European Championships	Munich, Germany	
400 m	44.88	George John Franks	29 May 2026	NCAA Division I East First Rounds	Lexington, United States	
800 m	1:45.00	Panagiotis Stroubakos	13 August 1997	Weltklasse Zürich	Zürich, Switzerland	
1500 m	3:36.74	Panagiotis Stroubakos	24 August 1997		Cologne, Germany	
3000 m	7:44.26	Panagiotis Papoulias	12 July 1996		Bellinzona, Switzerland	
5000 m	13:28.59	Panagiotis Papoulias	11 June 1995	European Cup First League	Turku, Finland	
10,000 m	28:07.17	Spyros Andriopoulos	30 August 1987	World Championships	Rome, Italy	
10 km (road)	29:47	Panagiotis Charamis	15 November 1998		Limassol, Cyprus	
Half marathon	1:03:04	Spyros Andriopoulos	18 December 1988		Palermo, Italy	
25 km (road)	1:18:57	Spyridon Nakos	8 November 1980		Youngstown, United States	
Marathon	2:12:04	Spyros Andriopoulos	9 October 1988	Berlin Marathon	Berlin, Germany	
30 miles (road)	3:05:21	Dimitrios Theodorakakos	8 February 2020		Athens, Greece	
50 km (road)	3:12:41	Dimitrios Theodorakakos	8 February 2020		Athens, Greece	
24 Hour run	303.506 km	Yiannis Kouros	1997	Sri Chinmoy Ultra Festival	Adelaide, Australia	
110 m hurdles	13.33 (−1.2 m/s)	Konstadinos Douvalidis	7 July 2015	István Gyulai Memorial	Székesfehérvár, Hungary	
400 m hurdles	47.82	Periklis Iakovakis	6 May 2006		Osaka, Japan	
3000 m steeplechase	8:24.01	Filippos Filippou	15 September 1983		Casablanca, Morocco	
High jump	2.36 m	Labros Papakostas	21 July 1992		Athens, Greece	
Pole vault	6.20 m	Emmanouil Karalis	27 August 2026	Weltklasse Zürich	Zürich, Switzerland	
Long jump	8.66 m (+1.6 m/s)	Louis Tsatoumas	2 June 2007		Kalamata, Greece	
Long jump	8.66 m (+1.0 m/s)	Miltiadis Tentoglou	26 July 2026	Greek Championships	Volos, Greece	
Triple jump	17.55 m (+0.8 m/s)	Dimitrios Tsiamis	18 June 2006	European Cup First League	Thessaloniki, Greece	
Shot put	21.05 m	Nicholas Scarvelis	28 June 2020		Scottsdale, United States	
Discus throw	65.11 m	Dimitrios Pavlidis	13 April 2025	Oklahoma Throws Series World Invitational	Ramona, United States	
Hammer throw	80.45 m	Alexandros Papadimitriou	9 July 2000		Athens, Greece	
Javelin throw	91.69 m	Konstadinos Gatsioudis	24 June 2000		Kuortane, Finland	
Decathlon	8069 pts	Prodromos Korkizoglou	1–2 July 2000		Ibach, Switzerland	
Decathlon	100m (wind) / Long jump (wind) / Shot put / High jump / 400m / 110m H (wind) / Discus / Pole vault / Javelin / 1500m; 10.60 (+1.3 m/s) / 7.24 m / 14.39 m / 2.01 m / 49.86 / 14.25 (+0.4 m/s) / 41.82 m / 5.00 m / 56.93 m / 4:50.77					
10,000 m walk (track)	39:37.65	Elefthérios Thanópoulos	27 April 2002		Patras, Greece	
20,000 m walk (track)	1:24:25.5	Dimitrios Orfanopoulos	23 April 1989		Faliro, Greece	
20 km walk (road)	1:21:12	Alexandros Papamichail	4 August 2012	Olympic Games	London, Great Britain	
35 km walk (road)	2:34:48	Alexandros Papamichail	24 July 2022	World Championships	Eugene, United States	
Marathon race walk (road)	3:18:25	Alexandros Papamichail	15 August 2026	European Championships	Birmingham, United Kingdom	
50,000 m walk (track)	4:00:15.5	Christos Karagiorgos	7 May 1988		Bergen, Norway	
50 km walk (road)	3:49:56	Alexandros Papamichail	11 August 2012	Olympic Games	London, Great Britain	
4 × 100 m relay	38.61	Greece; Vasilios Seggos; Alexios Alexopoulos; Georgios Panagiotopoulos; Christoforos Choidis	19 June 1999	European Cup Super League	Paris, France	
4 × 200 m relay	1:29.93	K. Yeorgalás; M. Hristoforidis; N. Poutsikis; E. Hristoforidis	12 May 1985		Thessaloniki, Greece	
4 × 400 m relay	3:02.21	Greece; Dimitrios Regas; Georgios Doupis; Dimitris Gravalos; Periklis Iakovakis	24 June 2007	European Cup Super League	Munich, Germany	

=== Women ===
Event	Record	Athlete	Date	Meet	Place	Ref.
100 m	10.83 (+0.1 m/s)	Ekaterini Thanou	22 August 1999	World Championships	Seville, Spain	
200 m	22.67	Ekaterini Koffa	16 June 1996		Athens, Greece	
400 m	50.45	Maria Belibasaki	11 August 2018	European Championships	Berlin, Germany	
800 m	1:59.29	Georgia Despollari	11 August 2026 (Note: by official result and World Athletics sources; 10 August by SEGAS source, a typo)	European Championships	Birmingham, United Kingdom	
1500 m	4:05.63	Konstantina Efentaki	17 July 2004	Meeting de Atletismo Madrid	Madrid, Spain	
Mile (road)	4:44.0	Melissa Anastasakis	9 September 2023	Brașov Running Festival	Brașov, Romania	
3000 m	8:55.77 (Note: indoor mark ratified as absolute record)	Konstantina Efentaki	23 August 2005		Linz, Austria	
5000 m	15:04.03	Maria Protopappa	25 August 2006	Memorial Van Damme	Brussels, Belgium	
5 km (road)	15:44	Alexi Pappas	24 November 2016		San José, Puerto Rico	
10,000 m	31:36.16	Alexi Pappas	12 August 2016	Olympic Games	Rio de Janeiro, Brazil	
10 km (road)	32:20	Anastasia Marinakou	11 January 2026	10K Valencia Ibercaja by Kiprun	Valencia, Spain	
15 km (road)	50:48+	Ouranía Reboúli	10 July 2016	European Championships	Amsterdam, Netherlands	
20 km (road)	1:08.01+	Anastasia Marinakou	15 February 2026	Barcelona Half Marathon	Barcelona, Spain	
Half marathon	1:11:37	Anastasia Marinakou	15 February 2026	Barcelona Half Marathon	Barcelona, Spain	
Marathon	2:33:40	Maria Polizou	23 August 1998	European Championships	Budapest, Hungary	
100 m hurdles	12.64 (+0.4 m/s)	Voula Patoulidou	6 August 1992	Olympic Games	Barcelona, Spain	
400 m hurdles	52.77	Fani Chalkia	22 August 2004	Olympic Games	Athens, Greece	
2000 m steeplechase	6:35.19	Xenia Kasimirova	5 July 2003			
3000 m steeplechase	9:30.72	Irene Kokinariou	13 June 2008		Athens, Greece	
High jump	2.03 m	Niki Bakogianni	3 August 1996	Olympic Games	Atlanta, United States	
Pole vault	4.91 m	Katerina Stefanidi	6 August 2017	World Championships	London, United Kingdom	
Long jump	7.03 m (+0.6 m/s)	Niki Xanthou	18 August 1997		Bellinzona, Switzerland	
Triple jump	15.32 m (+0.9 m/s)	Hrysopiyí Devetzí	21 August 2004	Olympic Games	Athens, Greece	
Shot put	19.10 m	Irini Terzoglou	14 June 2003		Trikala, Greece	
Discus throw	67.72 m	Ekaterini Voggoli	10 June 2004		Athens, Greece	
Hammer throw	72.10 m	Stiliani Papadopoulou	20 July 2008		Nikiti, Greece	
Javelin throw	67.51 m	Mirela Manjani	30 September 2000	Olympic Games	Sydney, Australia	
Heptathlon	6235 pts	Argiro Strataki	27–28 May 2006	Hypo-Meeting	Götzis, Austria	
Heptathlon	100m H (wind) / High jump / Shot put / 200m (wind) / Long jump (wind) / Javelin / 800m; 13.93 / 1.76 m / 13.81 m / 24.60 (+0.5 m/s) / 6.34 m (+0.7 m/s) / 45.16 m / 2:15.09					
10,000 m walk (track)	42:55.85	Déspina Zapounídou	23 April 2016		Drama, Greece	
10 km walk (road)	44:12	Athina Papayianni	7 August 2005			
20,000 m walk (track)	1:37:40.59	Déspina Zapounídou	22 January 2012		Patras, Greece	
20 km walk (road)	1:28:12	Antigoni Ntrismpioti	12 February 2023	Australian Open 20 km Race Walking Championships	Melbourne, Australia	
20 km walk (road)	~~1:27:54~~ X	~~Athanasia Tsoumeleka~~	21 August 2008	Olympic Games	Beijing, China	
35 km walk (road)	2:41:58	Antigoni Ntrismpioti	22 July 2022	World Championships	Eugene, United States	
Marathon race walk (road)	3:22:16	Antigoni Ntrismpioti	15 August 2026	European Championships	Birmingham, United Kingdom	
50 km walk (road)	4:56:00	Aggelikí Makrí	14 January 2018	Greek Race Walk Championships	Marathon, Greece	
4 × 100 m relay	43.07	Greece; Maria Tsoni; Ekaterini Koffa; Marina Vasarmidou; Ekaterini Thanou	18 June 1997	Mediterranean Games	Bari, Italy	
4 × 400 m relay	3:26.33	Greece; Olga Kaidantzi; Hrisoula Goudenoudi; Hariklia Bouda; Fani Halkia	20 June 2004	European Cup Super League	Bydgoszcz, Poland	

=== Mixed ===
Event	Record	Athlete	Date	Meet	Place	Ref.
4 × 100 m relay	41.74	Greece; Vasilios Mirianthopoulos; Rafaéla Spanoudaki-Hatziriga; Sotirios Garaganis; Polyniki Emmanouilidou	2 September 2026	Mediterranean Games	Taranto, Italy	
4 × 400 m relay	3:19.02	Greece; Vladimiros Andreadis; Andrianna Ferra; George John Franks; Dimitra Tsoukala	29 June 2025	European Team Championships	Madrid, Spain	

== Indoor ==
=== Men ===
Event	Record	Athlete	Date	Meet	Place	Ref.
50 m	5.71	Georgios Theodoridis	17 January 1998			
50 m	5.71	Georgios Theodoridis	25 February 2001	Meeting Pas de Calais	Liévin, France	
60 m	6.50	Haralabos Papadias	7 March 1997	World Championships	Paris, France	
200 m	20.62	Alexis Alexopoulos	11 February 1996		Piraeus, Greece	
400 m	45.83	George John Franks	13 February 2026	Clemson Tiger Paw Invitational	Clemson, United States	
800 m	1:48.64	Konstadínos Nakópoulos	28 January 2014	Vienna Indoor Classic	Vienna, Austria	
1500 m	3:39.63	Panagiotis Papoulias	1 February 1998		Piraeus, Greece	
3000 m	7:43.66 (Note: outdoor mark ratified as absolute record)	Panagiotis Papoulias	21 February 1998		Piraeus, Greece	
60 m hurdles	7.59	Konstadinos Douvalidis	9 February 2020	Metz Indoor Meeting	Metz, France	
High jump	2.35 m	Lambros Papakostas	12 March 1995	World Championships	Barcelona, Spain	
Pole vault	6.17 m	Emmanouil Karalis	28 February 2026	Greek Championships	Peania, Greece	
Long jump	8.55 m	Miltiadis Tentoglou	18 March 2022	World Championships	Belgrade, Serbia	
Triple jump	17.12 m	Dimitrios Tsiamis	18 February 2006		Athens, Greece	
Shot put	20.38 m	Nicholas Scarvelis	17 January 2020 (Note: by World Athletics source; 15 January by federation source, probably a mistake)	Larry Wieczorek Invitational	Iowa, United States	
Weight throw	24.06 m	Konstadínos Záltos	27 January 2024	Jack Johnson Classic	Minneapolis, United States	
Heptathlon	6032 pts	Prodromos Korkizoglou	11–12 February 2000		Piraeus, Greece	
Heptathlon	60m / Long jump / Shot put / High jump / 60m H / Pole vault / 1000m; 6.91 / 7.15 m / 15.34 m / 1.99 m / 8.00 / 5.00 m / 2:49.61					
5000 m walk	19:01.44	Aléxandros Papamihaíl	17 February 2024	Greek Championships	Piraeus, Greece	
4 × 400 m relay	3:10.16	Greece; Georgios Ikonomidis; Dimitrios Giepos; Georgios Doupis; Stilianos Dimotsios	10 March 2001	World Championships	Lisbon, Portugal	

=== Women ===
Event	Record	Athlete	Date	Meet	Place	Ref.
50 m	6.31	Voula Patoulidou	14 January 1989		Thessaloniki, Greece	
60 m	6.96	Ekaterini Thanou	7 March 1999	World Championships	Maebashi, Japan	
200 m	22.71	Katerina Koffa	21 February 1998		Piraeus, Greece	
400 m	51.68	Fani Halkia	6 March 2004	World Championships	Budapest, Hungary	
600 m	1:29.33	Eirini Vasileiou	28 January 2023	Manchester World Indoor Tour	Manchester, United Kingdom	
800 m	2:02.08	Eleni Filandra	4 February 2012		Piraeus, Greece	
1500 m	4:08.73	Konstantina Efentaki	29 January 2005	Sparkassen Cup	Stuttgart, Germany	
3000 m	8:53.95	Konstantina Efentaki	18 February 2005	Aviva Indoor Grand Prix	Birmingham, United Kingdom	
3000 m	~~8:52.21~~ X	~~Maria Tsírba~~	15 March 2003	World Championships	Birmingham, United Kingdom	
60 m hurdles	7.91	Flora Redoumi	7 March 2004	World Championships	Budapest, Hungary	
High jump	1.96 m	Niki Bakoyianni	11 February 1996		Piraeus, Greece	
High jump	1.96 m	Niki Bakoyianni	10 March 1996	European Championships	Stockholm, Sweden	
Pole vault	4.90 m	Ekaterini Stefanidi	20 February 2016	Millrose Games	New York City, United States	
Long jump	6.91 m	Niki Xanthou	16 February 1997	Meeting Pas de Calais	Liévin, France	
Triple jump	14.84 m	Hrysopiyí Devetzí	4 March 2003		Peania, Greece	
Triple jump	~~15.00 m~~ X	~~Hrysopiyí Devetzí~~	8 March 2008	World Championships	Valencia, Spain	
Shot put	19.03 m	Kalliopi Ouzouni	22 January 2000		Piraeus, Greece	
Weight throw	24.06 m	Stamatía Skarvélis	23 February 2019	SEC Championships	Fayetteville, United States	
Pentathlon	4550 pts	Aryiro Strataki	4 February 2007		Athens, Greece	
Pentathlon	60m H / High jump / Shot put / Long jump / 800m; 8.47 / 1.75 m / 14.50 m / 6.14 m / 2:15.21					
3000 m walk	12:18.26	Antigoni Ntrismpioti	18 February 2023	Greek Championships	Piraeus, Greece	
5000 m walk	21:37.79	Christina Papadopoulou	28 February 2026	Greek Championships	Peania, Greece	
4 × 400 m relay	3:32.88	Greece; Eleftheria Papadopoulou; Hrisoula Goudenoudi; Yeoryia Koumnaki; Fani Halkia	7 March 2004	World Championships	Budapest, Hungary	
