= Georgia Abatzidou =

Greek long-distance runner (born 1969)

Personal information
- Nationality: Greek
- Born: 19 April 1969 (age 57) Servia, Greece

Sport
- Sport: Long-distance running
- Event: Marathon

Georgia Abatzidou (born 19 April 1969) is a Greek long-distance runner. She competed in the women's marathon at the 2004 Summer Olympics.
