= Zuzana Schindlerová =

Czech race walker

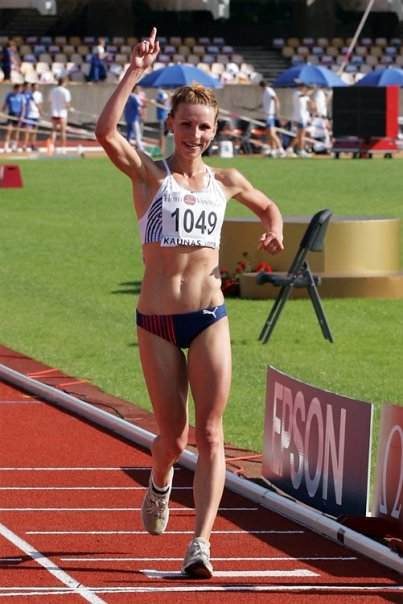
- Schindlerová winning Silver at European Athletics U23 Championships

Medal record

Women's athletics

Representing Czech Republic

European U23 Championships
| Silver medal – second place | 2009 Kaunas | 20 km race walking |

Zuzana Schindlerová (born 25 April 1987) is a Czech race walker.

== Biography ==
She competed at championship in Lugano 9 March 2008 with a time 1:33:15 A-limit at 20 km race and has qualified for 2008 Summer Olympics in Beijing. She has finished the olympic race as 27th with time 1:32:57. 6 minutes and 26 seconds behind the winner Olga Kaniskina from Russia. In the year of 2009 she has won the silver medal in Kaunas, Lithuania at European Athletics U23 Championships. At IAAF World Championships in Athletics in Berlin 2009 she finished 19th.

She has won the Czech Championships in 20 km race walking twice. She won the first gold in 2008 in Poděbrady.
