= 2022 European Athletics Championships – Women's 35 kilometres walk =

Women's 35 kilometres walk at the 2022 European Athletics Championships
- Location: Munich
- Dates: August 16
- Competitors: 22 from 13 nations
- Winning result: 2:47:00

Medalists
gold medal	Antigoni Drisbioti	Greece
silver medal	Raquel González	Spain
bronze medal	Viktória Madarász	Hungary

The women's 35 kilometres race walk at the 2022 European Athletics Championships took place at the streets of Munich on 16 August.

== Records ==
Standing records prior to the 2022 European Athletics Championships
World record	world records will be recognised after 1 January 2023			
European record	María Pérez (ESP)	2:39:16	Lepe, Spain	30 January 2022
Championship record	new event			
World Leading	Margarita Nikiforova (RUS)	2:38:47	Cheboksary, Russia	21 May 2022
Europe Leading	Margarita Nikiforova (RUS)	2:38:47	Cheboksary, Russia	21 May 2022

== Schedule ==
Date	Time	Round
16 August 2022	8:30	Final

All times are local times (UTC+2)

== Results ==
The start on 8:30.

Rank	Name	Nationality	Time	Note
1st place, gold medalist(s)	Antigoni Drisbioti	Greece	2:47:00	CR
2nd place, silver medalist(s)	Raquel González	Spain	2:49:10	
3rd place, bronze medalist(s)	Viktória Madarász	Hungary	2:49:58	PB
4	Federica Curiazzi	Italy	2:52:06	PB
5	Olga Niedziałek	Poland	2:53:12	
6	Lidia Barcella	Italy	2:55:04	SB
7	Mar Juárez	Spain	2:55:27	
8	Inna Loseva	Ukraine	2:57:55	SB
9	Inês Henriques	Portugal	2:58:34	
10	Elisa Neuvonen	Finland	2:59:00	
11	Bethan Davies	Great Britain	2:59:38	
12	Tereza Ďurdiaková	Czech Republic	3:01:19	SB
13	Rita Récsei	Hungary	3:04:49	
14	Ema Hačundová	Slovakia	3:06:13	PB
15	Antía Chamosa	Spain	3:06:37	
16	Efstathia Kourkoutsaki	Greece	3:07:42	
17	Katrin Schusters	Germany	3:18:38	
18	Tamara Havrylyuk	Ukraine	3:21:01	SB
	Mihaela Acatrinei	Romania	DNF	
	Kiriaki Filtisakou	Greece	DNF	
	Vitória Oliveira	Portugal	DNF	
	Ana Veronica Rodean	Romania	DNF	
