= Greece at the 1997 World Championships in Athletics =

- WA code: GRE
- National federation: Hellenic Amateur Athletic Association
- Website: www.segas.gr

in (Greece) Athens
- Competitors: 27
- Medals Ranked 29th: Gold 0 Silver 1 Bronze 1 Total 2

World Championships in Athletics appearances (overview)
- 1983; 1987; 1991; 1993; 1995; 1997; 1999; 2001; 2003; 2005; 2007; 2009; 2011; 2013; 2015; 2017; 2019; 2022; 2023

Greece hosted the 1997 World Championships in Athletics in the Olympic Stadium of Athens. The team consisted of 27 athletes (16 men and 11 women).

== Medals ==
Medal	Name	Event	Notes
Silver	Niki Xanthou	Women's long jump	6.94 SB
Bronze	Konstadinos Gatsioudis	Men's javelin throw	86.64

== Results ==
Name	Event	Place	Notes
Olga Vasdeki	Women's triple jump	4th	14.62 NR
Georgios Panagiotopoulos	Men's 200 metres	5th	20.32 PB
Lambros Papakostas	Men's high jump	6th	2.32 SB
Styliani Tsikouna	Women's discus throw	7th	61.92
Christos Meletoglou	Men's triple jump	7th	17.12

== See also ==
- Greece at the IAAF World Championships in Athletics
