= 1997 World Championships in Athletics =

Athletics competition in Athens, Greece

6th World Championships in Athletics
- Host city: Athens, Greece
- Nations: 198
- Athletes: 1882
- Dates: 1–10 August 1997
- Opened by: President Konstantinos Stephanopoulos
- Main venue: Olympic Stadium

The 6th World Championships in Athletics (Greek: Παγκόσμιο Πρωτάθλημα Στίβου 1997), under the auspices of the International Association of Athletic Federations, were held at the Olympic Stadium, Athens, Greece between 1 and 10 August 1997. 1,882 athletes from 198 participant nations participated in this event.

It was the first edition to award wild cards to defending champions even if they did not qualify for their national team. This allowed four athletes from the same country to compete in an individual event in some cases.

== Men's results ==
=== Track ===
1993 | 1995 | 1997 | 1999 | 2001

Event	Gold		Silver		Bronze	
100 metres	Maurice Greene; United States (USA)	9.86	Donovan Bailey; Canada (CAN)	9.91	Tim Montgomery; United States (USA)	9.94
200 metres	Ato Boldon; Trinidad and Tobago (TRI)	20.04	Frankie Fredericks; Namibia (NAM)	20.23	Claudinei Quirino; Brazil (BRA)	20.26
400 metres	Michael Johnson; United States (USA)	44.12	Davis Kamoga; Uganda (UGA)	44.37 NR	Tyree Washington; United States (USA)	44.39 PB
800 metres	Wilson Kipketer; Denmark (DEN)	1:43.38	Norberto Téllez; Cuba (CUB)	1:44.00	Rich Kenah; United States (USA)	1:44.25 PB
1500 metres	Hicham El Guerrouj; Morocco (MAR)	3:35.83	Fermín Cacho; Spain (ESP)	3:36.63	Reyes Estévez; Spain (ESP)	3:37.26
5000 metres	Daniel Komen; Kenya (KEN)	13:07.38	Khalid Boulami; Morocco (MAR)	13:09.34	Tom Nyariki; Kenya (KEN)	13:11.09
10,000 metres	Haile Gebrselassie; Ethiopia (ETH)	27:24.58	Paul Tergat; Kenya (KEN)	27:25.62	Salah Hissou; Morocco (MAR)	27:28.67 PB
Marathon	Abel Antón; Spain (ESP)	2:13:16	Martín Fiz; Spain (ESP)	2:13:21	Steve Moneghetti; Australia (AUS)	2:14:16
110 metres hurdles	Allen Johnson; United States (USA)	12.93 WL	Colin Jackson; Great Britain & N.I. (GBR)	13.05	Igor Kováč; Slovakia (SVK)	13.18
400 metres hurdles	Stéphane Diagana; France (FRA)	47.70 WL	Llewellyn Herbert; South Africa (RSA)	47.86 NR	Bryan Bronson; United States (USA)	47.88
3000 metres steeplechase	Wilson Boit Kipketer; Kenya (KEN)	8:05.84	Moses Kiptanui; Kenya (KEN)	8:06.04	Bernard Barmasai; Kenya (KEN)	8:06.04
20 kilometres walk	Daniel García; Mexico (MEX)	1:21:43	Mikhail Shchennikov; Russia (RUS)	1:21:53	Mikhail Khmelnitskiy; Belarus (BLR)	1:22:01
50 kilometres walk	Robert Korzeniowski; Poland (POL)	3:44:46	Jesús Ángel García; Spain (ESP)	3:44:59	Miguel Ángel Rodríguez; Mexico (MEX)	3:48:30
4 × 100 metres relay	Canada; Robert Esmie; Glenroy Gilbert; Bruny Surin; Donovan Bailey; Carlton Chambers*	37.86 WL	Nigeria; Osmond Ezinwa; Olapade Adeniken; Francis Obikwelu; Davidson Ezinwa	38.07	Great Britain & N.I. Darren Braithwaite; Darren Campbell; Douglas Walker; Julian Golding; Marlon Devonish*; Dwain Chambers*	38.14
4 × 400 metres relay^{[nb1]}	Great Britain & N.I. Iwan Thomas; Roger Black; Jamie Baulch; Mark Richardson; Mark Hylton*	2:56.65	Jamaica; Michael McDonald; Greg Haughton; Danny McFarlane; Davian Clarke; Linval Laird*	2:56.75 NR	Poland; Tomasz Czubak; Piotr Rysiukiewicz; Piotr Haczek; Robert Maćkowiak	3:00.26
WR world record | AR area record | CR championship record | GR games record | NR national record | OR Olympic record | PB personal best | SB season best | WL world leading (in a given season)

Note: * Indicates athletes who ran in preliminary rounds.

- ^{nb1} The United States (Jerome Young, Antonio Pettigrew, Chris Jones, and Tyree Washington) originally won the 4 × 400 m relay in 2:56.47, but were disqualified in 2009, after Antonio Pettigrew admitted to using HGH and EPO between 1997 and 2003.

=== Field ===
1993 | 1995 | 1997 | 1999 | 2001

Event	Gold		Silver		Bronze	
High jump	Javier Sotomayor; Cuba (CUB)	2.37 m WL	Artur Partyka; Poland (POL)	2.35 m	Tim Forsyth; Australia (AUS)	2.35 m
Pole vault	Sergey Bubka; Ukraine (UKR)	6.01 m CR/WL	Maksim Tarasov; Russia (RUS)	5.96 m	Dean Starkey; United States (USA)	5.91 m
Long jump	Iván Pedroso; Cuba (CUB)	8.42 m	Erick Walder; United States (USA)	8.38 m	Kirill Sosunov; Russia (RUS)	8.18 m
Triple jump	Yoelbi Quesada; Cuba (CUB)	17.85 m WL/NR	Jonathan Edwards; Great Britain & N.I. (GBR)	17.69 m	Aliecer Urrutia; Cuba (CUB)	17.64 m
Shot put^{[nb2]}	John Godina; United States (USA)	21.44 m	Oliver-Sven Buder; Germany (GER)	21.24 m	C.J. Hunter; United States (USA)	20.33 m
Discus throw	Lars Riedel; Germany (GER)	68.54 m	Virgilijus Alekna; Lithuania (LTU)	66.70 m	Jürgen Schult; Germany (GER)	66.14 m
Hammer throw	Heinz Weis; Germany (GER)	81.78 m	Andriy Skvaruk; Ukraine (UKR)	81.46 m	Vasiliy Sidorenko; Russia (RUS)	80.76 m
Javelin throw	Marius Corbett; South Africa (RSA)	88.40 m AR	Steve Backley; Great Britain & N.I. (GBR)	86.80 m	Kostas Gatsioudis; Greece (GRE)	86.64 m
Decathlon	Tomáš Dvořák; Czech Republic (CZE)	8837 pts CR/WL/NR	Eduard Hämäläinen; Finland (FIN)	8730 pts NR	Frank Busemann; Germany (GER)	8652 pts
WR world record | AR area record | CR championship record | GR games record | NR national record | OR Olympic record | PB personal best | SB season best | WL world leading (in a given season)

- ^{nb2} Aleksandr Bagach of Ukraine originally won the shot put with 21.47 m, but was disqualified after he tested positive for steroids.

== Women's results ==
=== Track ===
1993 | 1995 | 1997 | 1999 | 2001

Event	Gold		Silver		Bronze	
100 metres	Marion Jones; United States (USA)	10.83 WL	Zhanna Pintusevich; Ukraine (UKR)	10.85	Savatheda Fynes; Bahamas (BAH)	11.03 PB
200 metres	Zhanna Pintusevich; Ukraine (UKR)	22.32	Susanthika Jayasinghe; Sri Lanka (SRI)	22.39	Merlene Ottey; Jamaica (JAM)	22.40
400 metres	Cathy Freeman; Australia (AUS)	49.77	Sandie Richards; Jamaica (JAM)	49.79 PB	Jearl Miles Clark; United States (USA)	49.90
800 metres	Ana Fidelia Quirot; Cuba (CUB)	1:57.14	Yelena Afanasyeva; Russia (RUS)	1:57.56	Maria Mutola; Mozambique (MOZ)	1:57.59
1500 metres	Carla Sacramento; Portugal (POR)	4:04.24	Regina Jacobs; United States (USA)	4:04.63	Anita Weyermann; Switzerland (SUI)	4:04.70
5000 metres	Gabriela Szabo; Romania (ROU)	14:57.68	Roberta Brunet; Italy (ITA)	14:58.29	Fernanda Ribeiro; Portugal (POR)	14:58.85
10,000 metres	Sally Barsosio; Kenya (KEN)	31:32.92 WJR	Fernanda Ribeiro; Portugal (POR)	31:39.15	Masako Chiba; Japan (JPN)	31:41.93
Marathon	Hiromi Suzuki; Japan (JPN)	2:29:48	Manuela Machado; Portugal (POR)	2:31:12	Lidia Șimon; Romania (ROU)	2:31:55
10 kilometres walk	Annarita Sidoti; Italy (ITA)	42:55.49 WL	Olga Kardopoltseva; Belarus (BLR)	43:30.20	Valentina Tsybulskaya; Belarus (BLR)	43:49.24
100 metres hurdles	Ludmila Engquist; Sweden (SWE)	12.50	Svetla Dimitrova; Bulgaria (BUL)	12.58	Michelle Freeman; Jamaica (JAM)	12.61
400 metres hurdles	Nezha Bidouane; Morocco (MAR)	52.97 AR	Deon Hemmings; Jamaica (JAM)	53.09	Kim Batten; United States (USA)	53.52
4 × 100 metres relay	United States; Chryste Gaines; Marion Jones; Inger Miller; Gail Devers	41.47 CR/AR	Jamaica; Beverly McDonald; Merlene Frazer; Juliet Cuthbert; Beverly Grant	42.10	France; Patricia Girard-Léno; Christine Arron; Delphine Combe; Sylviane Félix; Frédérique Bangué*	42.21 NR
4 × 400 metres relay	Germany; Anke Feller; Uta Rohländer; Anja Rücker; Grit Breuer	3:20.92 WL	United States; Maicel Malone-Wallace; Kim Graham; Kim Batten; Jearl Miles Clark; Michelle Collins*; Natasha Kaiser-Brown*	3:21.03	Jamaica; Inez Turner; Lorraine Graham; Deon Hemmings; Sandie Richards; Nadia Graham-Hutchinson*	3:21.30 NR
WR world record | AR area record | CR championship record | GR games record | NR national record | OR Olympic record | PB personal best | SB season best | WL world leading (in a given season)

Note: * Indicates athletes who ran in preliminary rounds.

=== Field ===
1993 | 1995 | 1997 | 1999 | 2001

Event	Gold		Silver		Bronze	
High jump	Hanne Haugland; Norway (NOR)	1.99 m	Olga Kaliturina; Russia (RUS) Inha Babakova; Ukraine (UKR)	1.96 m	Not awarded	
Long jump	Lyudmila Galkina; Russia (RUS)	7.05 m WL/PB	Niki Xanthou; Greece (GRE)	6.94 m	Fiona May; Italy (ITA)	6.91 m
Triple jump	Šárka Kašpárková; Czech Republic (CZE)	15.20 m WL/NR	Rodica Mateescu; Romania (ROU)	15.16 m NR	Olena Hovorova; Ukraine (UKR)	14.67 m PB
Shot put	Astrid Kumbernuss; Germany (GER)	20.71 m	Vita Pavlysh; Ukraine (UKR)	20.66 m	Stephanie Storp; Germany (GER)	19.22 m
Discus throw	Beatrice Faumuina; New Zealand (NZL)	66.82 m	Ellina Zvereva; Belarus (BLR)	65.90 m	Natalya Sadova; Russia (RUS)	65.14 m
Javelin throw	Trine Hattestad; Norway (NOR)	68.78 m	Joanna Stone; Australia (AUS)	68.64 m PB	Tanja Damaske; Germany (GER)	67.12 m PB
Heptathlon	Sabine Braun; Germany (GER)	6739 pts	Denise Lewis; Great Britain & N.I. (GBR)	6654 pts	Remigija Nazarovienė; Lithuania (LTU)	6566 pts
WR world record | AR area record | CR championship record | GR games record | NR national record | OR Olympic record | PB personal best | SB season best | WL world leading (in a given season)

== Medal table ==
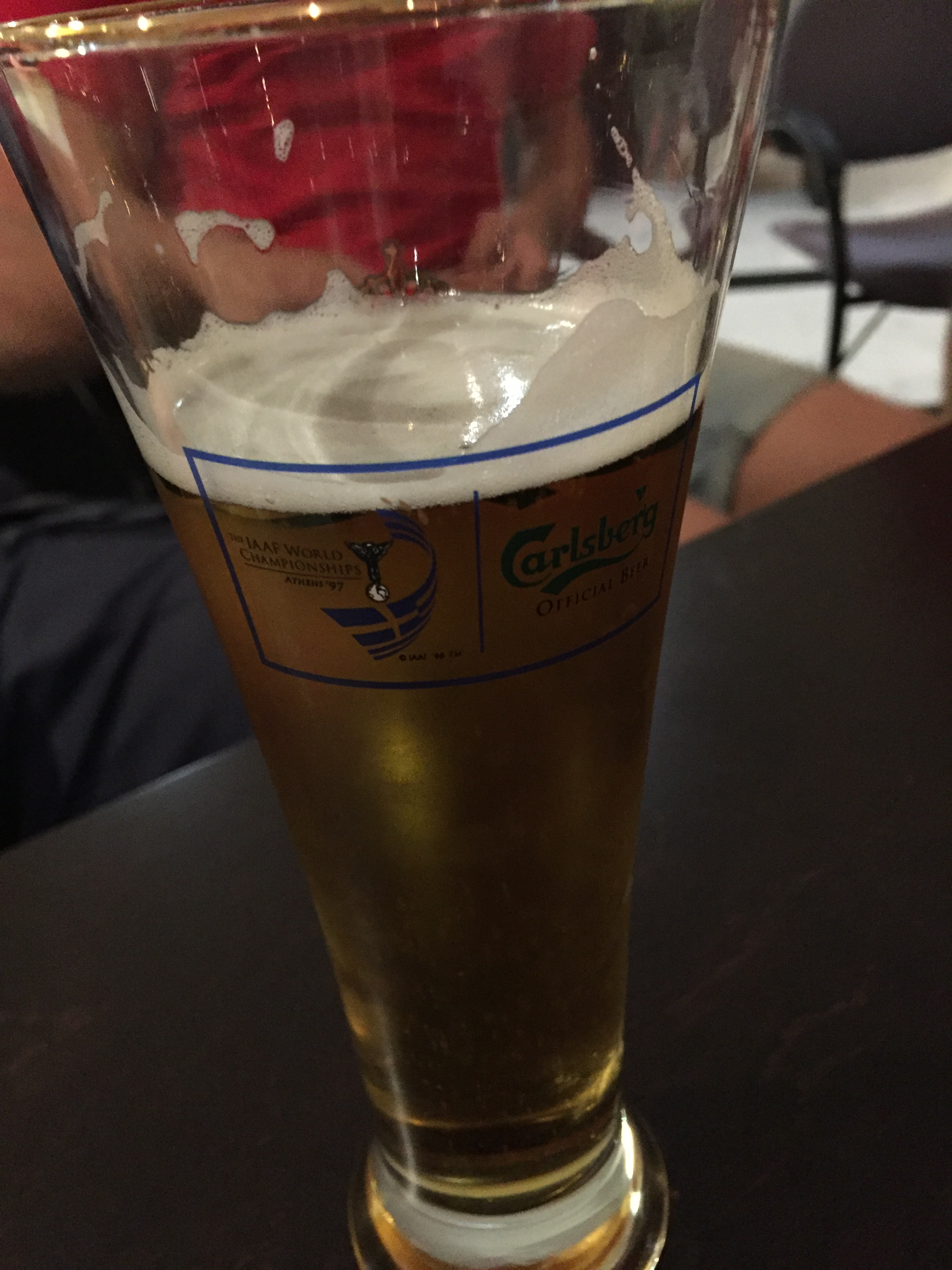
Beer glass with championships branding

* Host nation (Greece)

Rank	Nation	Gold	Silver	Bronze	Total
1	United States (USA)	6	3	8	17
2	Germany (GER)	5	1	4	10
3	Cuba (CUB)	4	1	1	6
4	Kenya (KEN)	3	2	2	7
5	Ukraine (UKR)	2	4	1	7
6	Morocco (MAR)	2	1	1	4
7	Czech Republic (CZE)	2	0	0	2
7	Norway (NOR)	2	0	0	2
9	Russia (RUS)	1	4	3	8
10	Great Britain (GBR)	1	4	1	6
11	Spain (ESP)	1	3	1	5
12	Portugal (POR)	1	2	1	4
13	Australia (AUS)	1	1	2	4
14	Italy (ITA)	1	1	1	3
14	Poland (POL)	1	1	1	3
14	Romania (ROM)	1	1	1	3
17	Canada (CAN)	1	1	0	2
17	South Africa (RSA)	1	1	0	2
19	France (FRA)	1	0	1	2
19	Japan (JPN)	1	0	1	2
19	Mexico (MEX)	1	0	1	2
22	Denmark (DEN)	1	0	0	1
22	Ethiopia (ETH)	1	0	0	1
22	New Zealand (NZL)	1	0	0	1
22	Sweden (SWE)	1	0	0	1
22	Trinidad and Tobago (TRI)	1	0	0	1
27	Jamaica (JAM)	0	4	3	7
28	Belarus (BLR)	0	2	2	4
29	Greece*	0	1	1	2
29	Lithuania (LTU)	0	1	1	2
31	Bulgaria (BUL)	0	1	0	1
31	Finland (FIN)	0	1	0	1
31	Namibia (NAM)	0	1	0	1
31	Nigeria (NGR)	0	1	0	1
31	Sri Lanka (SRI)	0	1	0	1
31	Uganda (UGA)	0	1	0	1
37	Bahamas (BAH)	0	0	1	1
37	Brazil (BRA)	0	0	1	1
37	Mozambique (MOZ)	0	0	1	1
37	Slovakia (SVK)	0	0	1	1
37	Switzerland (SUI)	0	0	1	1
Totals (41 entries)		44	45	43	132
