= Gloria Privileggio =

Greek long-distance runner

Personal information
- Born: 18 July 1988 (age 37) Greece

Sport
- Country: Greece
- Sport: Athletics
- Event: Marathon

Achievements and titles
- Personal best(s): 2:35:28 (2019)

Gloria Privileggio (Greek: Γκλόρια Πριβιλέτζιο; born 18 July 1988), also spelled Gloria Priviletzio, is a Greek long-distance runner. She competed in the Marathon at the 2019 World Athletics Championships in Doha, finishing in the 29th place. A former swimmer, she got involved in running in 2013.

Her personal best (2:35:28) ranks her third among all-time Greek female marathon runners.

In 2021, she won the Athens Classic Marathon with a time of 2:41.30.

== Personal ==
Privileggio was born in Greece to parents from Istanbul. Her father is of Italian ancestry.

== Competition record ==
Year	Competition	Venue	Position	Event	Notes
2017	World Championships	London, UK	71st	Marathon	2:57:06
2018	European Championships	Berlin, Germany	26th	Marathon	2:38:39 PB
2019	World Championships	Doha, Qatar	29th	Marathon	2:58:43
2021	Athens Classic Marathon	Athens, Greece	1st	Marathon	2:41.30
