= 2001 World Championships in Athletics =

Athletics competition in Edmonton, Alberta, Canada

8th World Championships in Athletics
- Host city: Edmonton, Alberta, Canada
- Nations: 189
- Athletes: 1602
- Dates: 3–12 August 2001
- Opened by: Prime Minister of Canada Jean Chretien
- Closed by: IAAF President Lamine Diack
- Main venue: Commonwealth Stadium

The 8th World Championships in Athletics, under the auspices of the International Association of Athletics Federations, were held at Commonwealth Stadium in Edmonton, Alberta, Canada between 3 and 12 August 2001 and was the first time the event had visited North America. The music for the opening and closing ceremonies was composed by Canadian composers Jan Randall and Cassius Khan. The ceremonies also featured a thousand-strong voice choir, and the Edmonton Symphony Orchestra.

Edmonton defeated bids from Paris, France (which hosted the next edition) and the San Francisco Bay Area in the United States to host the event. Edmonton had previously hosted the 1978 Commonwealth Games and the 1983 Summer Universiade.

== Men's results ==
=== Track ===
1997 | 1999 | 2001 | 2003 | 2005

Event	Gold		Silver		Bronze	
100 m	Maurice Greene; United States	9.82 (WL)	Bernard Williams; United States	9.94^{2} (PB)	Ato Boldon; Trinidad and Tobago	9.98
200 m	Konstantinos Kenteris; Greece	20.04	Christopher Williams; Jamaica	20.20	Kim Collins; Saint Kitts and Nevis	20.30 (NR St.Kitts)
200 m	Konstantinos Kenteris; Greece	20.04	Christopher Williams; Jamaica	20.20	Shawn Crawford; United States	20.30 (NR St.Kitts)
400 m	Avard Moncur; Bahamas	44.64	Ingo Schultz; Germany	44.87	Greg Haughton; Jamaica	44.98
800 m	André Bucher; Switzerland	1:43.70	Wilfred Bungei; Kenya	1:44.55	Paweł Czapiewski; Poland	1:44.63 (PB)
1500 m	Hicham El Guerrouj; Morocco	3:30.68	Bernard Lagat; Kenya	3:31.10	Driss Maazouzi; France	3:31.54 (SB)
5000 m	Richard Limo; Kenya	13:00.77	Million Wolde; Ethiopia	13:03.47^{1}	John Kibowen; Kenya	13:05.20
10,000 m	Charles Kamathi; Kenya	27:53.25	Assefa Mezgebu; Ethiopia	27:53.97	Haile Gebrselassie; Ethiopia	27:54.41
Marathon	Gezahegne Abera; Ethiopia	2:12:42 (SB)	Simon Biwott; Kenya	2:12:43	Stefano Baldini; Italy	2:13:18
110 m hurdles	Allen Johnson; United States	13.04 (WL)	Anier García; Cuba	13.07 (SB)	Dudley Dorival; Haiti	13.25 (NR)
400 m hurdles	Félix Sánchez; Dominican Republic	47.49 (WL)	Fabrizio Mori; Italy	47.54 (NR)	Dai Tamesue; Japan	47.89 (NR)
3000 m st.	Reuben Kosgei; Kenya	8:15.16	Ali Ezzine; Morocco	8:16.21	Bernard Barmasai; Kenya	8:16.59
20 km walk	Roman Rasskazov; Russia	1:20:31	Ilya Markov; Russia	1:20:33	Viktor Burayev; Russia	1:20:36
50 km walk	Robert Korzeniowski; Poland	3:42.08 (WL)	Jesús Ángel García; Spain	3:43:07 (SB)	Edgar Hernández; Mexico	3:46:12 (PB)
4 × 100 m relay	South Africa; Morne Nagel; Corne Du Plessis; Lee-Roy Newton; Mathew Quinn	38.47 (NR)	Trinidad and Tobago; Marc Burns; Ato Boldon; Jaycey Harper; Darrel Brown	38.58 (NR)	Australia; Matthew Shirvington; Paul Di Bella; Steve Brimacombe; Adam Basil	38.83 (SB)
4 × 400 m relay	Bahamas; Avard Moncur; Chris Brown; Troy McIntosh; Tim Munnings; Carl Oliver*	2:58.19^{4} (NR)	Jamaica; Brandon Simpson; Christopher Williams; Greg Haughton; Danny McFarlane; Michael Blackwood*; Mario Watts*	2:58.39 (SB)	Poland; Rafał Wieruszewski; Piotr Haczek; Piotr Długosielski; Piotr Rysiukiewicz; Jacek Bocian*	2:59.71 (SB)
WR world record | AR area record | CR championship record | GR games record | NR national record | OR Olympic record | PB personal best | SB season best | WL world leading (in a given season)

Note: * Indicates athletes who ran in preliminary rounds.
^{1} Ali Saïdi-Sief of Algeria originally finished second in the 5000 m in 13:02.16, but he was disqualified after he tested positive for nandrolone.
^{2} Tim Montgomery (USA) originally came second in the men's 100 meters in 9.85, but he was disqualified in 2005 after he admitted to drug use as a result of the BALCO scandal.
^{3} The USA originally finished first in 37.96 (Mickey Grimes, Bernard Williams, Dennis Mitchell, Tim Montgomery), but they were disqualified in 2005 after Tim Montgomery admitted to drug use as a result of the BALCO scandal.
^{4} The United States (Leonard Byrd, Antonio Pettigrew, Derrick Brew, Angelo Taylor) originally finished first in 2:57.54, but were disqualified in 2008 after Antonio Pettigrew admitted to using HGH and EPO between 1997 and 2003.

=== Field ===
1997 | 1999 | 2001 | 2003 | 2005 | 2007

Event	Gold		Silver		Bronze	
High jump	Martin Buß; Germany	2.36 (WL)	Yaroslav Rybakov; Russia	2.33 (PB Rybakov) (SB Voronin)		
High jump	Martin Buß; Germany	2.36 (WL)	Vyacheslav Voronin; Russia	2.33 (PB Rybakov) (SB Voronin)		
Pole vault	Dmitri Markov; Australia	6.05 (CR)	Aleksandr Averbukh; Israel	5.85	Nick Hysong; United States	5.85 (SB)
Long jump	Iván Pedroso; Cuba	8.40	Savanté Stringfellow; United States	8.24	Carlos Calado; Portugal	8.21 (SB)
Triple jump	Jonathan Edwards; Great Britain and Northern Ireland	17.92 (WL)	Christian Olsson; Sweden	17.47	Igor Spasovkhodskiy; Russia	17.44 (PB)
Shot put	John Godina; United States	21.87	Adam Nelson; United States	21.24	Arsi Harju; Finland	20.93 (SB)
Discus throw	Lars Riedel; Germany	69.72 (CR)	Virgilijus Alekna; Lithuania	69.40	Michael Möllenbeck; Germany	67.61 (PB)
Hammer throw	Szymon Ziółkowski; Poland	83.38 (CR)	Koji Murofushi; Japan	82.92	Ilya Konovalov; Russia	80.27 (SB)
Javelin throw	Jan Železný; Czech Republic	92.80 (CR)	Aki Parviainen; Finland	91.31	Konstadinos Gatsioudis; Greece	89.95
Decathlon	Tomáš Dvořák; Czech Republic	8902 (CR)	Erki Nool; Estonia	8815 (NR)	Dean Macey; Great Britain and Northern Ireland	8603 (PB)
WR world record | AR area record | CR championship record | GR games record | NR national record | OR Olympic record | PB personal best | SB season best | WL world leading (in a given season)

== Women's results ==
=== Track ===
1997 | 1999 | 2001 | 2003 | 2005

Event	Gold		Silver		Bronze	
100 m	Zhanna Pintusevich; Ukraine	10.82 (WL)	Ekaterini Thanou; Greece	10.91^{2} (SB)	Chandra Sturrup; Bahamas	11.02
200 m	Debbie Ferguson; Bahamas	22.52^{1}	LaTasha Jenkins; United States	22.85	Cydonie Mothersille; Cayman Islands	22.88^{2}
400 m	Amy Mbacké Thiam; Senegal	49.86 (NR)	Lorraine Fenton; Jamaica	49.88 (SB)	Ana Guevara; Mexico	49.97; SB
800 m	Maria Mutola; Mozambique	1:57.17	Stephanie Graf; Austria	1:57.20 (SB)	Letitia Vriesde; Suriname	1:57.35 (SB)
1500 m	Gabriela Szabo; Romania	4:00.57 (SB)	Violeta Szekely; Romania	4:01.70	Natalya Gorelova; Russia	4:02.40
5000 m	Olga Yegorova; Russia	15:03.39	Marta Domínguez; Spain	15:06.59	Ayelech Worku; Ethiopia	15:10.17
10,000 m	Derartu Tulu; Ethiopia	31:48.81	Berhane Adere; Ethiopia	31:48.85	Gete Wami; Ethiopia	31:49.98
Marathon	Lidia Șimon; Romania	2:26:01	Reiko Tosa; Japan	2:26:06	Svetlana Zakharova; Russia	2:26:18
100 m hurdles	Anjanette Kirkland; United States	12.42 (WL)	Gail Devers; United States	12.54; SB	Olga Shishigina; Kazakhstan	12.58 (SB)
400 m hurdles	Nezha Bidouane; Morocco	53.34 (WL)	Yuliya Pechonkina; Russia	54.27	Daimí Pernía; Cuba	54.51
20 km walk	Olimpiada Ivanova; Russia	1:27:48 (CR)	Valentina Tsybulskaya; Belarus	1:28:49 (PB)	Elisabetta Perrone; Italy	1:28:56
4 × 100 m relay	Germany; Melanie Paschke; Gabi Rockmeier; Birgit Rockmeier; Marion Wagner	42.32^{3} (SB)	France; Sylviane Félix; Frédérique Bangué; Muriel Hurtis; Odiah Sidibé	42.39 (SB)	Jamaica; Juliet Campbell; Merlene Frazer; Beverly McDonald; Astia Walker; Elva Goulbourne*	42.40 (SB)
4 × 400 m relay	Jamaica; Sandie Richards; Catherine Scott-Pomales; Debbie-Ann Parris; Lorraine Fenton; Michelle Burgher*; Deon Hemmings*	3:20.65 (WL)	Germany; Florence Ekpo-Umoh; Shanta Ghosh; Claudia Marx; Grit Breuer	3:21.97 (SB)	Russia; Irina Rosikhina; Yuliya Pechonkina; Anastasiya Kapachinskaya; Olesya Zykina; Natalya Shevtsova*	3:24.92
WR world record | AR area record | CR championship record | GR games record | NR national record | OR Olympic record | PB personal best | SB season best | WL world leading (in a given season)

Note: * Indicates athletes who ran in preliminary rounds.
^{1} Kelli White originally finished third in the 200 m in 22.56, but she was disqualified in 2004 after she admitted to using steroids as a result of the BALCO doping scandal.
^{2} Marion Jones (USA) finished second in the 100 m in 10.85 and first in the 200 m in 22.39, but she was disqualified in 2005 after she admitted to using steroids as a result of the BALCO doping scandal.
^{3} The USA team of Kelli White, Chryste Gaines, Inger Miller, and Marion Jones originally finished first in a time of 41.71, but were disqualified in 2004 after Kelli White admitted to using steroids as a result of the BALCO doping scandal.

=== Field ===
1997 | 1999 | 2001 | 2003 | 2005 | 2007

Event	Gold		Silver		Bronze	
High jump	Hestrie Cloete; South Africa	2.00 (SB)	Inha Babakova; Ukraine	2.00	Kajsa Bergqvist; Sweden	1.97
Pole vault	Stacy Dragila; United States	4.75 (CR)	Svetlana Feofanova; Russia	4.75 (CR)	Monika Pyrek; Poland	4.55
Long jump	Fiona May; Italy	7.02	Tatyana Kotova; Russia	7.01	Niurka Montalvo; Spain	6.88
Triple jump	Tatyana Lebedeva; Russia	15.25 (WL)	Françoise Mbango-Etone; Cameroon	14.60	Tereza Marinova; Bulgaria	14.58
Shot put	Yanina Karolchik; Belarus	20.61 (NR)	Nadine Kleinert; Germany	19.86 (PB)	Vita Pavlysh; Ukraine	19.41
Discus throw	Ellina Zvereva; Belarus	67.10^{1}	Nicoleta Grasu; Romania	66.24	Anastasia Kelesidou; Greece	65.50 (SB)
Hammer throw	Yipsi Moreno; Cuba	70.65 (AR)	Olga Kuzenkova; Russia	70.61	Bronwyn Eagles; Australia	68.87
Javelin throw	Osleidys Menéndez; Cuba	69.53 (CR)	Mirela Maniani; Greece	65.78	Sonia Bisset; Cuba	64.69
Heptathlon	Yelena Prokhorova; Russia	6694 (SB)	Natallia Sazanovich; Belarus	6539 (SB)	Shelia Burrell; United States	6472 (PB)
WR world record | AR area record | CR championship record | GR games record | NR national record | OR Olympic record | PB personal best | SB season best | WL world leading (in a given season)

^{1}Natalya Sadova of Russia originally won the gold medal in discus throw (68.57), but she was later disqualified after she tested positive for caffeine.

== Medal table ==
Note that the host nation Canada did not win any medals at these championships. This makes Canada only the second championship host with such a distinction, after Sweden in 1995.

Rank	Nation	Gold	Silver	Bronze	Total
1	Russia	5	7	6	18
2	United States	5	5	3	13
3	Kenya	3	3	2	8
4	Germany	3	3	1	7
5	Cuba	3	1	2	6
6	Bahamas	3	0	1	4
7	Ethiopia	2	3	3	8
8	Belarus	2	2	0	4
8	Romania	2	2	0	4
10	Morocco	2	1	0	3
11	Poland	2	0	3	5
12	Czech Republic	2	0	0	2
12	South Africa	2	0	0	2
14	Jamaica	1	3	2	6
15	Greece	1	2	2	5
16	Italy	1	1	2	4
17	Ukraine	1	1	1	3
18	Australia	1	0	2	3
19	Great Britain	1	0	1	2
20	Dominican Republic	1	0	0	1
20	Mozambique	1	0	0	1
20	Senegal	1	0	0	1
20	Switzerland	1	0	0	1
24	Japan	0	2	1	3
24	Spain	0	2	1	3
26	Finland	0	1	1	2
26	France	0	1	1	2
26	Sweden	0	1	1	2
26	Trinidad and Tobago	0	1	1	2
30	Austria	0	1	0	1
30	Cameroon	0	1	0	1
30	Estonia	0	1	0	1
30	Israel	0	1	0	1
30	Lithuania	0	1	0	1
35	Mexico	0	0	2	2
36	Bulgaria	0	0	1	1
36	Cayman Islands	0	0	1	1
36	Haiti	0	0	1	1
36	Kazakhstan	0	0	1	1
36	Portugal	0	0	1	1
36	Saint Kitts and Nevis	0	0	1	1
36	Suriname	0	0	1	1
Totals (42 entries)		46	47	46	139

== See also ==
- 2001 in athletics (track and field)
