= Panayiota Tsinopoulou =

Greek athlete (born 1990)

Personal information
- Born: 16 October 1990 (age 35) Karditsa, Greece
- Height: 165 cm (5 ft 5 in)
- Weight: 54 kg (119 lb)

Sport
- Country: Greece
- Sport: Track and field
- Event: 20 kilometres race walk

Achievements and titles
- Personal bests: 20 km walk: 1:31.39 (2023); 10,000 m: 46.26.70 (2024); Marathon: 3:54.05 (2026); Indoors; 3000 m walk: 12.38.32 i (2024); 5000 m walk: 22.00.42 i (2026)

Panayiota Tsinopoulou (born 16 October 1990) is a Greek race walker. She competed in the women's 20 kilometres walk event at the 2016 Summer Olympics. She finished in 47th place with a time of 1:38:24.

== International competitions ==
Representing Greece
Year	Competition	Venue	Position	Event	Time
2016	Olympic Games	Rio de Janeiro, Brazil	47th	20 km walk	1:38:24
2021	Olympic Games	Tokyo, Japan	53rd	20 km walk	1:47:19
2024	European Championships	Rome, Italy	19th	20 km walk	1.34:13
2026	European Championships	Birmingham, UK	5th	Marathon race walk	3:25:14 PB
