= Athina Papayianni =

Greek race walker

Personal information
- Born: 18 August 1980 (age 46) Preveza

Sport
- Country: Greece
- Sport: Athletics
- Event: 20 km walk

Achievements and titles
- Personal best: 1:28.58 NR

Athina Papayianni (also Papagianni, Greek: Αθηνά Παπαγιάννη, born 18 August 1980) is a Greek race walker. She was sixth at the 2005 World Championships in Athletics in Helsinki.

== Achievements ==
Year	Competition	Venue	Position	Event	Notes	
Representing Greece
2000	Olympic Games	Sydney, Australia	11th	20 km	1:33:14	
2001	European U23 Championships	Amsterdam, Netherlands	6th	20 km	1:33:37	
2001	World Championships	Edmonton, Alberta	11th	20 km	1:34:56 20 km	1:37:21
2002	European Championships	Munich, Germany	11th	20 km	1:31:45 SB	
2004	Olympic Games	Athens, Greece	10th	20 km	1:30:37	
2005	World Championships	Helsinki, Finland	6th	20 km	1:29:21 SB	
