= Eirini Kokkinariou =

Greek long-distance runner

Personal information
- Native name: Ειρήνη Κοκκιναρίου
- Born: February 14, 1981 (age 44) Athens, Greece
- Occupation: Athlete
- Years active: 2006-present
- Height: 170 cm (5 ft 7 in)
- Weight: 126 lb (57 kg)

Sport
- Country: Greece
- Sport: Athletics
- Event: 3000m steeplechase
- Updated on 18 January 2014

Eirini Kokkinariou (Greek: Ειρήνη Κοκκιναρίου, born 14 February 1981 in Athens, Greece) is a female Greek long-distance runner. She competes mostly in the 3000 metres steeplechase event. In 2012, she was banned from the sport for four years after doping.

She finished ninth at the 2006 World Cup and took the third place at the 2007 Superleague. She competed at the 2006 European Championships, the 2007 World Championships, the 2008 Olympic Games, the 2009 World Championships and the 2011 World Championships without reaching the final.

== Personal bests ==
Date	Event	Venue	Performance
13 July 2008	3000 metres steeplechase	Athens, Greece	9:30.72 s (NR)
1 September 2009	3000 metres	Rovereto, Italy	9:19.58 s
9 February 2008	3000 metres (indoor)	Peania, Greece	9:17.74 s

== Achievements ==
Year	Competition	Venue	Position	Notes
Representing Greece
2006	European Championships	Gothenburg, Sweden	21st	9:53.07 s (NR)
2006	World Cup	Athens, Greece	9th	
2009	World Championships	Berlin, Germany	19th	9:35.61 s (SB)
