= Antigoni Drisbioti =

Greek race walker (born 1984)

Antigoni Drisbioti OLY
- Drisbioti in 2026

Personal information
- Born: 21 March 1984 (age 42) Karditsa, Greece
- Height: 1.61 m (5 ft 3 in)
- Weight: 50 kg (110 lb)

Sport
- Country: Greece
- Sport: Athletics
- Event: Race walking
- Coached by: Brent Vallance

Achievements and titles
- Personal bests: 20 km walk: 1.28.12 NR (Melbourne 2023); 35 km walk: 2:41:58 NR (Eugene 2022); Marathon walk: 3:22:16 NR (Birmingham 2026); 3000 m walk Indoors: 12:18.26i NR (Piraeus 2023)
Medal record
Women's athletics
Representing Greece
World Championships
Bronze medal – third place	2023 Budapest	35 km walk
European Championships
Gold medal – first place	2022 Munich	20 km walk
Gold medal – first place	2022 Munich	35 km walk
Mediterranean Games
Bronze medal – third place	2013 Mersin	20 km walk

Antigoni Drisbioti (Greek: Αντιγόνη Ντρισμπιώτη; born 21 March 1984) is a Greek race walker, who is widely considered as the best Greek walker of all time.

Drisbioti won gold medals in the 20 kilometres walk and 35 km race walk at the 2022 European Athletics Championships, the first golden double for Greece at the event. She also won the bronze medal in the 35 km race walk at the 2023 World Athletics Championships held in Budapest. In 2026, at the European Athletics Championships in Birmingham, Drisbioti finished fourth in the women's marathon race walk in a personal-best time of 3:22:16.

In addition, Drisbioti finished fourth in the 35 km walk at the 2022 World Athletics Championships. In addition, she took bronze in the 20 km walk at the 2013 Mediterranean Games. She represented Greece at the 2016 Rio and 2020 Tokyo and the 2024 Paris Olympics.

In Greece, she was named as the Greek Female Athlete of the Year for 2022 and 2023. Drisbioti is the current Greek record holder for the 3000 m walk, 20 km walk and 35 km walk, while she has won eight national titles.

== Early life and career ==
Drisbioti was born in Karditsa (Greece), but her family soon had to move to the town of Atalanti for better working conditions. She lived there until the age of 8 before returning to Karditsa, where she completed high school.

Her family run a small taverna in the center of the town, where, according to her own statements in a television interview, she worked for many years during her training. She decided to take up walking as a sport as a freshman in high school and made her international debut at the age of 19 at the 2003 European Race Walking Cup held in Cheboksary, Russia. But the same year, Drisbioti gave up her sporting career, started studying Sports Science and only began to train and dedicate herself to the sport again in 2011 aged 27.

Drisbioti celebrated her first major success at age 29 at the 2013 Mediterranean Games in Mersin, Turkey, where she won the bronze medal in the 20 km race walk with a time of 1:41:53.

She competed at the Summer Olympics for the first time in 2016 in Rio, finishing 15th in the 20 km walk. At the 2020 Tokyo Olympics, held in 2021 due to the COVID-19 pandemic, she placed eighth in the event.

At the 2022 European Athletics Championships in Munich, the 38-year-old won the gold medal in the 35 km walk with a championship record of 2:47:00 after finishing fourth at the World Championships in Eugene, Oregon the previous month in 2:41:58, a national record. With her second gold medal in Munich in the 20 km walk event in a personal best time of 1:29:03, she became the first Greek athlete to win two gold medals at a European Championships.

On 10 July 2024, the Greek Olympic Committee designated her as the flag bearer for the Paris 2024 Olympic Games, along with the Greek professional basketball player Giannis Antetokounmpo.

== Personal life ==
She is married and lives in Karditsa.

== Honours - Statistics ==
=== International competitions ===
Representing Greece
Year	Competition	Venue	Position	Event	Time
2003	European Race Walking Cup	Cheboksary, Russia	16th	10 km walk U20	51:18
2012	Balkan Race Walking Championships	Bucharest, Romania	–	20 km walk	DQ
2013	European Race Walking Cup	Dudince, Slovakia	26th	20 km walk	1:38:46
2013	Mediterranean Games	Mersin, Turkey	3rd	20 km walk	1:41:53
2013	World Championships	Moscow, Russia	28th	20 km walk	1:33:42 PB
2014	European Championships	Zürich, Switzerland	24th	20 km walk	1:35:54
2015	European Race Walking Cup	Murcia, Spain	27th	20 km walk	1:35:00
2016	World Race Walking Team Championships	Rome, Italy	39th	20 km walk	1:34:11
2016	Olympic Games	Rio de Janeiro, Brazil	15th	20 km walk	1:32:32
2017	European Race Walking Cup	Poděbrady, Czech Republic	–	20 km walk	DNF
2017	World Championships	London, United Kingdom	24th	20 km walk	1:32:03
2018	European Championships	Berlin, Germany	13th	20 km walk	1.32:16 SB
2019	Balkan Race Walking Championships	Alexandroupolis, Greece	–	20 km walk	DNF
2019	European Race Walking Cup	Alytus, Lithuania	9th	20 km walk	1:33:22
2019	World Championships	Doha, Qatar	22nd	20 km walk	1:38:56
2021	European Race Walking Team Championships	Poděbrady, Czech Republic	1st	35 km walk	2:49:55 PB
2021	Olympic Games	Tokyo, Japan	8th	20 km walk	1:31:24 SB
2022	World Race Walking Team Championships	Muscat, Oman	6th	20 km walk	1:34:54
2022	World Championships	Eugene, OR, United States	4th	35 km walk	2:41:58 NR
2022	European Championships	Munich, Germany	1st	20 km walk	1:29:03 PB
2022	European Championships	Munich, Germany	1st	35 km walk	2:47:00 CR
2023	European Race Walking Team Championships	Poděbrady, Czech Republic	1st	20 km walk	1:29:17
2023	World Championships	Budapest, Hungary	15th	20 km walk	1:30:19
2023	World Championships	Budapest, Hungary	3rd	35 km walk	2:43:22
2024	European Championships	Rome, Italy	16th	20 km walk	1.33:38 SB
2024	Olympic Games	Paris, France	22nd	20 km walk	1:31:33 SB
2025	World Championships	Tokyo, Japan	16th	20 km walk	1:29:49
2026	European Championships	Birmingham, UK	4th	Marathon race walk	3:22:16 NR

=== National titles ===
- Greek Athletics Championships
  - 20 kilometres race walk (3): 2018, 2020, 2023
  - 35 kilometres race walk (2): 2021, 2022
- Greek Indoor Athletics Championships
  - 3000 metres race walk (3): 2020, 2021, 2023

Olympic Games
Preceded by Eleftherios Petrounias; Anna Korakaki	Flagbearer for Greece; París 2024; With: Giannis Antetokounmpo	Succeeded by Incumbent
