= Alexandros Papamichail =

Greek racewalker (born 1988)

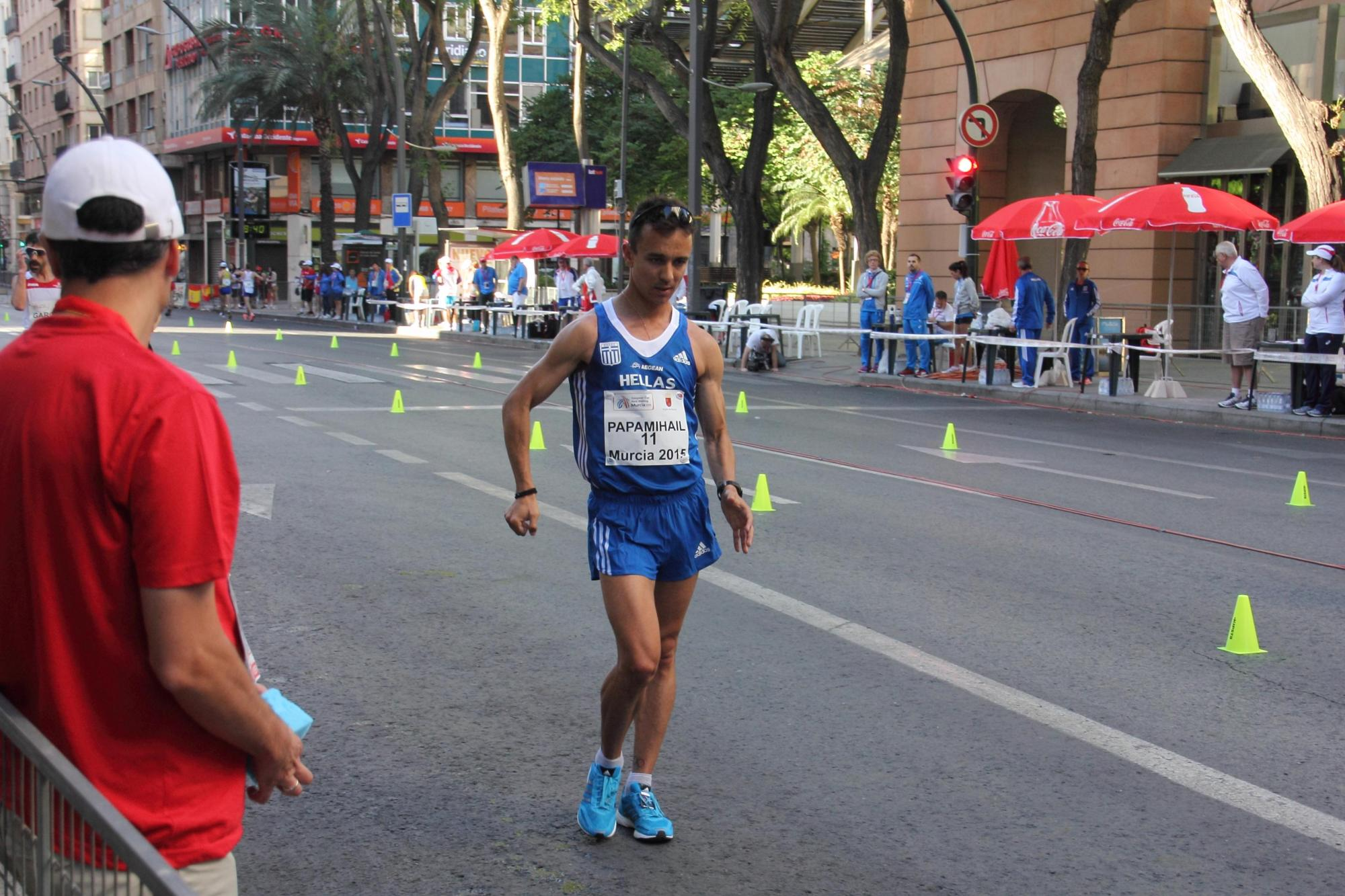
- Papamichail at the 2015 European Cup Race Walking

Personal information
- Born: 18 September 1988 (age 37)
- Height: 172 cm (5 ft 8 in)
- Weight: 63 kg (139 lb)

Sport
- Country: Greece
- Sport: Athletics
- Events: 20 km walk, 50 km walk

Achievements and titles
- Personal bests: 5 km walk (i): 19:01.44 (2024, NR); 10 km walk: 40.38; 20 km walk: 1:21.12 (2012, NR); 35 km walk: 2:34:48 (2022, NR); Marathon walk: 3:18:25 (2026, NR); 50 km walk: 3:49.56 (2012, NR)

Alexandros Papamichail (born 18 September 1988 in Karditsa) is a Greek racewalker. He competed in the 20 km walk at the 2012 Summer Olympics, where he placed 15th with a time of 1:21:12, a Greek national record. At the 2012 Olympic Games, he was also 22nd in the 50 km walk event setting one more national record.

The following year, he took the 16th place (20 km) at the World Championships in Moscow, while at the 2014 European Championships in Zurich, he was 13th (50 km).

He competed in both race walking distances at the 2016 Summer Olympics.

== Competition record ==
| Year | Competition | Venue | Position | Event | Notes |
Representing Greece
| 2004 | World Race Walking Cup (U20) | Naumburg, Germany | 39th | 10 km walk | 46:53 |
| 2005 | European Race Walking Cup (U20) | Miskolc, Hungary | 21st | 10 km walk | 45:29 |
| 2006 | World Race Walking Cup (U20) | A Coruña, Spain | 10th | 10 km walk | 43:31 |
| 2006 | World Junior Championships | Beijing, China | 9th | 10 km walk | 44:36.15 |
| 2007 | European Race Walking Cup (U20) | Royal Leamington Spa, United Kingdom | 13th | 10 km walk | 43:21 |
| 2007 | European Junior Championships | Hengelo, Netherlands | 5th | 10 km walk | 42:04.57 |
| 2009 | European Race Walking Cup | Metz, France | 22nd | 20 km walk | 1:33:31 |
| 2009 | Mediterranean Games | Pescara, Italy | 6th | 20 km walk | 1:28:04 |
| 2009 | European U23 Championships | Kaunas, Lithuania | 6th | 20 km walk | 1:25:06 |
| 2012 | Olympic Games | London, United Kingdom | 15th | 20 km walk | 1:21:12 NR |
| 2012 | Olympic Games | London, United Kingdom | 22nd | 50 km walk | 3:49:56 NR |
| 2013 | European Race Walking Cup | Dudince, Slovakia | 10th | 50 km walk | 3:51:05 |
| 2013 | World Championships | Moscow, Russia | 16th | 20 km walk | 1:23:48 |
| 2014 | European Championships | Zürich, Switzerland | – | 20 km walk | DNF |
| 2014 | European Championships | Zürich, Switzerland | 13th | 50 km walk | 3:49:58 |
| 2015 | European Race Walking Cup | Murcia, Spain | 5th | 50 km walk | 3:51:38 |
| 2015 | World Championships | Beijing, China | 25th | 20 km walk | 1:24:11 |
| 2015 | World Championships | Beijing, China | — | 50 km walk | DNF |
| 2016 | Olympic Games | Rio de Janeiro, Brazil | 20th | 20 km walk | 1:21:55 |
| 2016 | Olympic Games | Rio de Janeiro, Brazil | 27th | 50 km walk | 3:59:21 |
| 2018 | European Championships | Berlin, Germany | 15th | 20 km walk | 1:22.51 |
| 2019 | World Championships | Doha, Qatar | 17th | 50 km walk | 4:22.39 |
| 2021 | Olympic Games | Tokyo, Japan | 36th | 50 km walk | 4:12:49 |
| 2022 | World Championships | Eugene, Oregon | 29th | 35 km walk | 2:34:48 NR |
| 2023 | World Championships | Budapest, Hungary | 38th | 20 km walk | 1:24:26 SB |
| 2025 | World Championships | Tokyo, Japan | 29th | 35 km walk | 2:42:07 SB |
| 2026 | European Championships | Birmingham, UK | 21st | Marathon race walk | 3:18:25 NR |
