= 2014 European Athletics Championships – Women's pole vault =

Women's pole vault at the European Athletics Championships

The women's pole vault at the 2014 European Athletics Championships took place at the Letzigrund on 12 and 14 August.

== Medalists ==
Gold	Anzhelika Sidorova; Russia
Silver	Katerina Stefanidi; Greece
Bronze	Angelina Zhuk-Krasnova; Russia

== Records ==
Standing records prior to the 2014 European Athletics Championships
World record	Yelena Isinbayeva (RUS)	5.06 m	Zürich, Switzerland	28 August 2009
European record	Yelena Isinbayeva (RUS)	5.06 m	Zürich, Switzerland	28 August 2009
Championship record	Yelena Isinbayeva (RUS)	4.80 m	Gothenburg, Sweden	12 August 2006
World Leading	Fabiana Murer (BRA)	4.80 m	New York City, United States	14 June 2014
European Leading	Lisa Ryzih (GER)	4.71 m	Rottach-Egern, Germany	4 July 2014
European Leading	Katerina Stefanidi (GRE)	4.71 m	Fontvieille, Monaco	18 July 2014

== Schedule ==
Date	Time	Round
12 August 2014	10:30	Qualification
14 August 2014	19:19	Final

All times are local times (UTC+2)

== Results ==
=== Qualification ===
4.50 m (Q) or at least 12 best performers (q) advanced to the Final.

Rank	Group	Name	Nationality	4.00	4.15	4.25	4.35	4.45	4.50	Mark	Note
1	A	Carolin Hingst	Germany	–	o	o	o	o		4.45	q
1	A	Jiřina Svobodová	Czech Republic	–	–	–	o	o		4.45	q
3	B	Minna Nikkanen	Finland	–	o	o	xo	o		4.45	q
3	B	Angelina Zhuk-Krasnova	Russia	–	–	–	xo	o		4.45	q
5	A	Angelica Bengtsson	Sweden	–	o	xo	xo	o		4.45	q
6	B	Lisa Ryzih	Germany	–	–	–	o	xo		4.45	q
6	A	Katerina Stefanidi	Greece	–	–	–	o	xo		4.45	q
8	B	Kira Grünberg	Austria	–	o	o	xo	xo		4.45	q, NR
8	A	Anzhelika Sidorova	Russia	–	–	–	xo	xo		4.45	q
10	B	Alayna Lutkovskaya	Russia	–	–	o	xxo	xo		4.45	q
10	B	Tina Šutej	Slovenia	–	o	xo	xo	xo		4.45	q
12	A	Marion Lotout	France	–	xxo	xo	xo	xo		4.45	q
13	B	Nikolía Kiriakopoúlou	Greece	–	–	–	o	xxo		4.45	q
14	B	Marion Fiack	France	o	o	o	xo	xxx		4.35	
15	B	Anna Katharina Schmid	Switzerland	–	xo	o	xo	xxx		4.35	SB
16	A	Naroa Agirre	Spain	o	o	xo	xxo	xxx		4.35	
17	B	Katharina Bauer	Germany	–	–	o	xxx			4.25	
17	A	Vanessa Boslak	France	–	–	o	xxx			4.25	
17	A	Nicole Büchler	Switzerland	–	–	o	xxx			4.25	
17	B	Romana Maláčová	Czech Republic	–	o	o	xxx			4.25	
17	A	Sonia Malavisi	Italy	–	o	o	xxx			4.25	
22	B	Roberta Bruni	Italy	–	xo	o	xxx			4.25	
23	B	Caroline Bonde Holm	Denmark	–	xo	xxo	xxx			4.25	
24	B	Marta Onofre	Portugal	xo	o	xxx				4.15	
25	A	Catia Pereira	Portugal	xo	xxx					4.00	
26	A	Maria Leonor Tavares	Portugal	xo	xxx					4.00	
27	B	Katrine Haarklau	Norway	xxo	xxx					4.00	
	A	Hanna Sheleh	Ukraine	–	r					NM	
	A	Rebeka Šilhanová	Czech Republic	xxx						NM	

=== Final ===
Rank	Name	Nationality	4.35	4.45	4.55	4.60	4.65	Mark	Note
1st place, gold medalist(s)	Anzhelika Sidorova	Russia	xo	o	o	–	xxo	4.65	
2nd place, silver medalist(s)	Katerina Stefanidi	Greece	–	o	xo	xo	xxx	4.60	
3rd place, bronze medalist(s)	Angelina Zhuk-Krasnova	Russia	–	xo	o	xxo	xxx	4.60	
4	Lisa Ryzih	Germany	–	xxo	xo	xxo	xxx	4.60	
5	Angelica Bengtsson	Sweden	xxo	o	xxx			4.45	
6	Jiřina Svobodová	Czech Republic	xo	xxo	xxx			4.45	
7	Nikolía Kiriakopoúlou	Greece	o	xxx				4.35	
7	Alayna Lutkovskaya	Russia	o	–	xxx			4.35	
7	Minna Nikkanen	Finland	o	xxx				4.35	
10	Carolin Hingst	Germany	xxo	xxx				4.35	
10	Tina Šutej	Slovenia	xxo	xxx				4.35	
	Kira Grünberg	Austria	xxx					NM	
	Marion Lotout	France	xxx					NM	
