= 2010 World Junior Championships in Athletics – Women's pole vault =

The women's pole vault event at the 2010 World Junior Championships in Athletics was held in Moncton, New Brunswick, Canada, at Moncton Stadium on 23 and 24 July.

== Medalists ==
Gold	Angelica Bengtsson; Sweden
Silver	Victoria Von Eynatten; Germany
Bronze	Holly Bleasdale; United Kingdom

== Results ==
=== Final ===
24 July

Rank	Name	Nationality	Result	Notes
1st place, gold medalist(s)	Angelica Bengtsson	Sweden	4.25	
2nd place, silver medalist(s)	Victoria Von Eynatten	Germany	4.20	
3rd place, bronze medalist(s)	Holly Bleasdale	United Kingdom	4.15	
4	Anzhelika Sidorova	Russia	4.05	
5	Sara Bercan	Slovenia	4.05	
6	Caroline Hasse	Germany	3.95	
7	Kelsie Ahbe	United States	3.95	
7	Shade Weygandt	United States	3.95	
9	Amanda Bartrim	Australia	3.80	
9	Sally Scott	United Kingdom	3.80	
9	Hulda Þorsteinsdóttir	Iceland	3.80	
9	Kseniya Chertkoshvili	Ukraine	3.80	
	Michaela Meijer	Sweden	NH	

=== Qualifications ===
23 July

==== Group A ====
Rank	Name	Nationality	Result	Notes
1	Holly Bleasdale	United Kingdom	3.95	q
1	Michaela Meijer	Sweden	3.95	q
3	Anzhelika Sidorova	Russia	3.95	q
4	Kseniya Chertkoshvili	Ukraine	3.95	q
5	Caroline Hasse	Germany	3.95	q
6	Hulda Þorsteinsdóttir	Iceland	3.85	q
6	Kelsie Ahbe	United States	3.85	q
8	Alessandra Lazzari	Italy	3.85	
9	Kira Grünberg	Austria	3.85	
10	Natalia Krupinska	Poland	3.85	
	Mireia Bonjoch	Spain	NH	

==== Group B ====
Rank	Name	Nationality	Result	Notes
1	Shade Weygandt	United States	4.05	q
2	Victoria Von Eynatten	Germany	3.95	q
2	Angelica Bengtsson	Sweden	3.95	q
4	Amanda Bartrim	Australia	3.95	q
5	Sally Scott	United Kingdom	3.95	q
6	Sara Bercan	Slovenia	3.95	q
7	Aurélie De Ryck	Belgium	3.65	
	Karleigh Parker	Canada	NH	
	Marion Fiack	France	NH	
	Kerry Charlesworth	New Zealand	NH	

== Participation ==
According to an unofficial count, 21 athletes from 17 countries participated in the event.

- Australia (1)
- Austria (1)
- Belgium (1)
- Canada (1)
- France (1)
- Germany (2)
- Iceland (1)
- Italy (1)
- New Zealand (1)
- Poland (1)
- Russia (1)
- Slovenia (1)
- Spain (1)
- Sweden (2)
- Ukraine (1)
- United Kingdom (2)
- United States (2)
