= 2013 European Athletics U23 Championships – Women's pole vault =

The Women's pole vault event at the 2013 European Athletics U23 Championships was held in Tampere, Finland, at Ratina Stadium on 12 and 13 July.

== Medalists ==
Gold	Angelina Zhuk-Krasnova; Russia
Silver	Anzhelika Sidorova; Russia
Bronze	Angelica Bengtsson; Sweden

== Results ==
=== Final ===
13 July 2013

Rank	Name	Nationality	Attempts													Result	Notes
Rank	Name	Nationality	3.95	4.05	4.15	4.25	4.30	4.35	4.40	4.45	4.50	4.55	4.60	4.65	4.70	Result	Notes
1st place, gold medalist(s)	Angelina Zhuk-Krasnova	Russia	-	-	-	o	-	-	o	-	o	o	xo	o	o	4.70	CUR
2nd place, silver medalist(s)	Anzhelika Sidorova	Russia	-	-	-	-	o	-	o	-	xo	xo	o	xxx		4.60	PB
3rd place, bronze medalist(s)	Angelica Bengtsson	Sweden	-	-	xo	-	o	-	xo	xxo	o	xo	xxx			4.55	SB
4	Joana Kraft	Germany	-	-	o	o	o	xxo	o	xxx						4.40	=PB
5	Marion Fiack	France	-	o	o	o	xxo	-	xx-	x						4.30	
6	Lyudmila Yeryomina	Russia	-	o	o	o	-	xxx								4.25	
7	Anna Felzmann	Germany	xxo	o	xxo	xo	xxx									4.25	
8	Alessandra Lazzari	Italy	xo	-	xo	xxo	xxx									4.25	PB
9	Katie Byres	United Kingdom	-	o	o	xxx										4.15	
10	Kira Grünberg	Austria	o	xo	xo	xxx										4.15	
11	Aneta Morysková	Czech Republic	o	o	xxx											4.05	
12	Katrine Haarklau	Norway	-	xo	xxx											4.05	

=== Qualifications ===
Qualified: qualifying perf. 4.20 (Q) or 12 best performers (q) advance to the Final

==== Summary ====
Rank	Name	Nationality	Result	Notes
1	Katie Byres	United Kingdom	4.20	Q SB
1	Marion Fiack	France	4.20	Q
1	Joana Kraft	Germany	4.20	Q
1	Anzhelika Sidorova	Russia	4.20	Q
1	Angelina Zhuk-Krasnova	Russia	4.20	Q
6	Angelica Bengtsson	Sweden	4.20	Q
6	Kira Grünberg	Austria	4.20	Q NUR
8	Alessandra Lazzari	Italy	4.15	q
9	Katrine Haarklau	Norway	4.15	q
10	Lyudmila Yeryomina	Russia	4.10	q
11	Aneta Morysková	Czech Republic	4.10	q =PB
12	Anna Felzmann	Germany	4.05	q
13	Marta Onofre	Portugal	4.05	
13	Annika Roloff	Germany	4.05	
15	Miriam Galli	Italy	4.05	
16	Sara Berčan	Slovenia	4.05	=PB
17	Robin Wingbermühle	Netherlands	4.05	SB
18	Gina Reuland	Luxembourg	4.05	
19	Eleonora Romano	Italy	4.05	PB
20	Aurélie De Ryck	Belgium	3.95	
21	Sara Eriksson	Sweden	3.95	
22	Kseniya Chertkoshvili	Ukraine	3.95	
23	Erica Hjerpe	Finland	3.70	
24	Maialen Axpe	Spain	3.70	
25	Line Renée Jensen	Denmark	3.70	
26	Diána Szabó	Hungary	3.50	
	Edna Semedo	Luxembourg	NM	

==== Details ====
===== Group A =====
12 July 2013 / 12:20

Rank	Name	Nationality	Attempts								Result	Notes
Rank	Name	Nationality	3.50	3.70	3.85	3.95	4.05	4.10	4.15	4.20	Result	Notes
1	Katie Byres	United Kingdom	-	-	-	-	o	-	o	o	4.20	Q SB
1	Marion Fiack	France	-	-	-	o	o	-	o	o	4.20	Q
1	Anzhelika Sidorova	Russia	-	-	-	-	-	-	-	o	4.20	Q
4	Angelica Bengtsson	Sweden	-	-	-	-	-	-	xo	o	4.20	Q
5	Alessandra Lazzari	Italy	-	-	o	-	o	o	o	x	4.15	q
6	Aneta Morysková	Czech Republic	-	-	o	o	o	xo	xxx		4.10	q =PB
7	Marta Onofre	Portugal	-	o	-	xo	o	xxx			4.05	
7	Annika Roloff	Germany	-	-	-	xo	o	xxx			4.05	
9	Miriam Galli	Italy	-	-	o	o	xo	-	xxx		4.05	
10	Robin Wingbermühle	Netherlands	-	-	xo	xxo	xo	xxx			4.05	SB
11	Erica Hjerpe	Finland	-	o	xxx						3.70	
12	Maialen Axpe	Spain	xo	o	xxx						3.70	
13	Line Renée Jensen	Denmark	-	xo	xxx						3.70	
	Edna Semedo	Luxembourg	-	xxx							NM	

===== Group B =====
12 July 2013 / 12:20

Rank	Name	Nationality	Attempts								Result	Notes
Rank	Name	Nationality	3.50	3.70	3.85	3.95	4.05	4.10	4.15	4.20	Result	Notes
1	Joana Kraft	Germany	-	-	-	-	o	-	o	o	4.20	Q
1	Angelina Zhuk-Krasnova	Russia	-	-	-	-	-	-	-	o	4.20	Q
3	Kira Grünberg	Austria	-	-	-	o	o	xo	o	o	4.20	Q NUR
4	Katrine Haarklau	Norway	-	o	-	o	xo	-	o	x	4.15	q
5	Lyudmila Yeryomina	Russia	-	-	-	o	-	o	-	x	4.10	q
6	Anna Felzmann	Germany	-	-	o	-	o	-	xxx		4.05	q
7	Sara Berčan	Slovenia	-	o	o	xxo	xo	xxx			4.05	=PB
8	Gina Reuland	Luxembourg	-	-	xo	o	xxo	xxx			4.05	
9	Eleonora Romano	Italy	-	xxo	o	o	xxo	xxx			4.05	PB
10	Aurélie De Ryck	Belgium	-	o	o	o	xxx				3.95	
11	Sara Eriksson	Sweden	-	o	xo	o	xxx				3.95	
12	Kseniya Chertkoshvili	Ukraine	-	-	-	xo	xxx				3.95	
13	Diána Szabó	Hungary	o	xxx							3.50	

== Participation ==
According to an unofficial count, 27 athletes from 19 countries participated in the event.

- Austria (1)
- Belgium (1)
- Czech Republic (1)
- Denmark (1)
- Finland (1)
- France (1)
- Germany (3)
- Hungary (1)
- Italy (3)
- Luxembourg (2)
- Netherlands (1)
- Norway (1)
- Portugal (1)
- Russia (3)
- Slovenia (1)
- Spain (1)
- Sweden (2)
- Ukraine (1)
- United Kingdom (1)
