= 2012 IAAF World Indoor Championships – Women's pole vault =

The women's pole vault at the 2012 IAAF World Indoor Championships will be held at the Ataköy Athletics Arena on 11 March.

== Medalists ==
Gold	Silver	Bronze
Yelena Isinbayeva; Russia	Vanessa Boslak; France	Holly Bleasdale; Great Britain

== Records ==
Standing records prior to the 2012 IAAF World Indoor Championships
World record	Yelena Isinbayeva (RUS)	5.01	Stockholm, Sweden	23 February 2012
Championship record	Yelena Isinbayeva (RUS)	4.86	Budapest, Hungary	6 March 2004
World Leading	Yelena Isinbayeva (RUS)	5.01	Stockholm, Sweden	23 February 2012
African record	Elmarie Gerryts (RSA)	4.41	Birmingham, Great Britain	20 February 2000
Asian record	Li Ling (CHN)	4.51	Hangzhou, China	19 February 2012
European record	Yelena Isinbayeva (RUS)	5.01	Stockholm, Sweden	23 February 2012
North and Central American and Caribbean record	Jenn Suhr (USA)	4.88	Boston, United States	4 February 2012
Oceanian Record	Kym Howe (AUS)	4.72	Donetsk, Ukraine	10 February 2007
South American record	Fabiana Murer (BRA)	4.82	Birmingham, Great Britain	20 February 2010

== Qualification standards ==
Indoor
4.52

== Schedule ==
Date	Time	Round
March 11, 2012	14:00	Final

== Results ==
=== Final ===
Rank	Athlete	Nationality	4.30	4.45	4.55	4.65	4.70	4.75	4.80	5.02	Result	Notes
1st place, gold medalist(s)	Yelena Isinbayeva	Russia	—	—	—	—	o	—	o	xxx	4.80	
2nd place, silver medalist(s)	Vanessa Boslak	France	o	o	o	o	o	xxx			4.70	NR
3rd place, bronze medalist(s)	Holly Bleasdale	Great Britain	—	xo	—	o	xo	xxx			4.70	
4	Silke Spiegelburg	Germany	—	o	xo	o	xxx				4.65	
5	Lacy Janson	United States	xo	o	o	xxo	xxx				4.65	SB
6	Jiřina Ptáčníková	Czech Republic	o	o	o	xx—	x				4.55	
7	Yarisley Silva	Cuba	—	xo	o	xxx					4.55	
8	Nicole Büchler	Switzerland	o	o	xo	xxx					4.55	NR
9	Alana Boyd	Australia	o	xxo	xo	xxx					4.55	
10	Anastasia Savchenko	Russia	o	o	xxx						4.45	
11	Jillian Schwartz	Israel	o	xxo	xxx						4.45	
12	Kristina Gadschiew	Germany	o	xxx							4.30	
12	Hanna Shelekh	Ukraine	o	x							4.30	
14	Mary Saxer	United States	xxo	xxx							4.30	
	Katie Byres	Great Britain	xxx								NM	
	Caroline Bonde Holm	Denmark	xxx								NM	
