= 2015 European Athletics Indoor Championships – Women's pole vault =

The women's pole vault event at the 2015 European Athletics Indoor Championships was held on 6 March at 16:15 (qualification) and 8 March at 16:05 (final) local time.

== Medalists ==
Gold	Silver	Bronze
Anzhelika Sidorova; Russia	Katerina Stefanidi; Greece	Angelica Bengtsson; Sweden

== Results ==
=== Qualification ===
Qualification: Qualification Performance 4.60 (Q) or at least 8 best performers advanced to the final.

Rank	Athlete	Nationality	4.10	4.30	4.45	4.55	4.60	Result	Note
1	Anzhelika Sidorova	Russia	–	–	o	o	o	4.60	Q
1	Katerina Stefanidi	Greece	–	o	o	o	o	4.60	Q
3	Nikoleta Kyriakopoulou	Greece	–	–	o	xo	o	4.60	Q
3	Angelina Zhuk-Krasnova	Russia	–	–	xo	o	o	4.60	Q
5	Marion Fiack	France	–	o	o	xxo	o	4.60	Q
6	Katharina Bauer	Germany	–	o	o	o	xo	4.60	Q, =PB
7	Angelica Bengtsson	Sweden	–	xo	o	xo	xo	4.60	Q
8	Lisa Ryzih	Germany	–	–	o	o	xxx	4.55	q
9	Michaela Meijer	Sweden	o	xo	o	o	xxx	4.55	PB
10	Tina Šutej	Slovenia	–	xo	o	xxo	xxx	4.55	SB
11	Nicole Büchler	Switzerland	–	o	o	xxx		4.45	
11	Martina Strutz	Germany	–	o	o	xxx		4.45	
13	Malin Dahlström	Sweden	xo	o	o	xxx		4.45	SB
14	Jiřina Ptáčníková	Czech Republic	–	xxo	xo	xx–	x	4.45	
15	Kira Grünberg	Austria	–	o	xxo	xxx		4.45	NR
16	Romana Maláčová	Czech Republic	o	o	xxx			4.30	
16	Femke Pluim	Netherlands	o	o	xxx			4.30	
16	Anastasiya Savchenko	Russia	–	o	xxx			4.30	
19	Minna Nikkanen	Finland	o	xo	xxx			4.30	
20	Gina Reuland	Luxembourg	xo	xxo	xxx			4.30	NR
21	Angelica Moser	Switzerland	o	xxx				4.10	
22	Aneta Morysková	Czech Republic	xo	xxx				4.10	
	Wilma Murto	Finland						DNS	

=== Final ===
Rank	Athlete	Nationality	4.40	4.50	4.60	4.70	4.75	4.80	4.85	Result	Note
1st place, gold medalist(s)	Anzhelika Sidorova	Russia	–	o	o	o	o	o	xxx	4.80	PB
2nd place, silver medalist(s)	Katerina Stefanidi	Greece	o	–	xo	o	o	–	xxx	4.75	
3rd place, bronze medalist(s)	Angelica Bengtsson	Sweden	o	xo	o	o	xxx			4.70	NR
4	Angelina Zhuk-Krasnova	Russia	o	–	xxo	xx–	x			4.60	
5	Marion Fiack	France	o	o	xxx					4.50	
5	Nikoleta Kyriakopoulou	Greece	–	o	xxx					4.50	
	Katharina Bauer	Germany	xxx							NM	
	Lisa Ryzih	Germany								DNS	
