= 2012 World Junior Championships in Athletics – Women's pole vault =

The women's pole vault at the 2012 World Junior Championships in Athletics was held at the Estadi Olímpic Lluís Companys on 12 and 14 July.

The 2010 world junior champion, Angelica Bengtsson of Sweden, is eligible to defend her title.

== Medalists ==
Gold	Silver	Bronze
Angelica Bengtsson; Sweden	Elizabeth Parnov; Australia	Roberta Bruni; Italy

== Records ==
Prior to the competition, the existing world junior and championship records were as follows.

World Junior Record	Angelica Bengtsson (SWE)	4.63 m (i)	Stockholm, Sweden	22 February 2011
Championship Record	Floé Kühnert (GER)	4.40 m	Kingston, Jamaica	18 July 2002
Championship Record	Ekaterina Kolesova (RUS)	4.40 m	Bydgoszcz, Poland	11 July 2008
Championship Record	Valeriya Volik (RUS)	4.40 m	Bydgoszcz, Poland	11 July 2008
World Junior Leading	Angelica Bengtsson (SWE)	4.58 m	Sollentuna, Sweden	5 July 2012
Broken records during the 2012 World Junior Championships in Athletics
Championship Record	Angelica Bengtsson (SWE)	4.50	Barcelona, Spain	14 July 2012

== Results ==
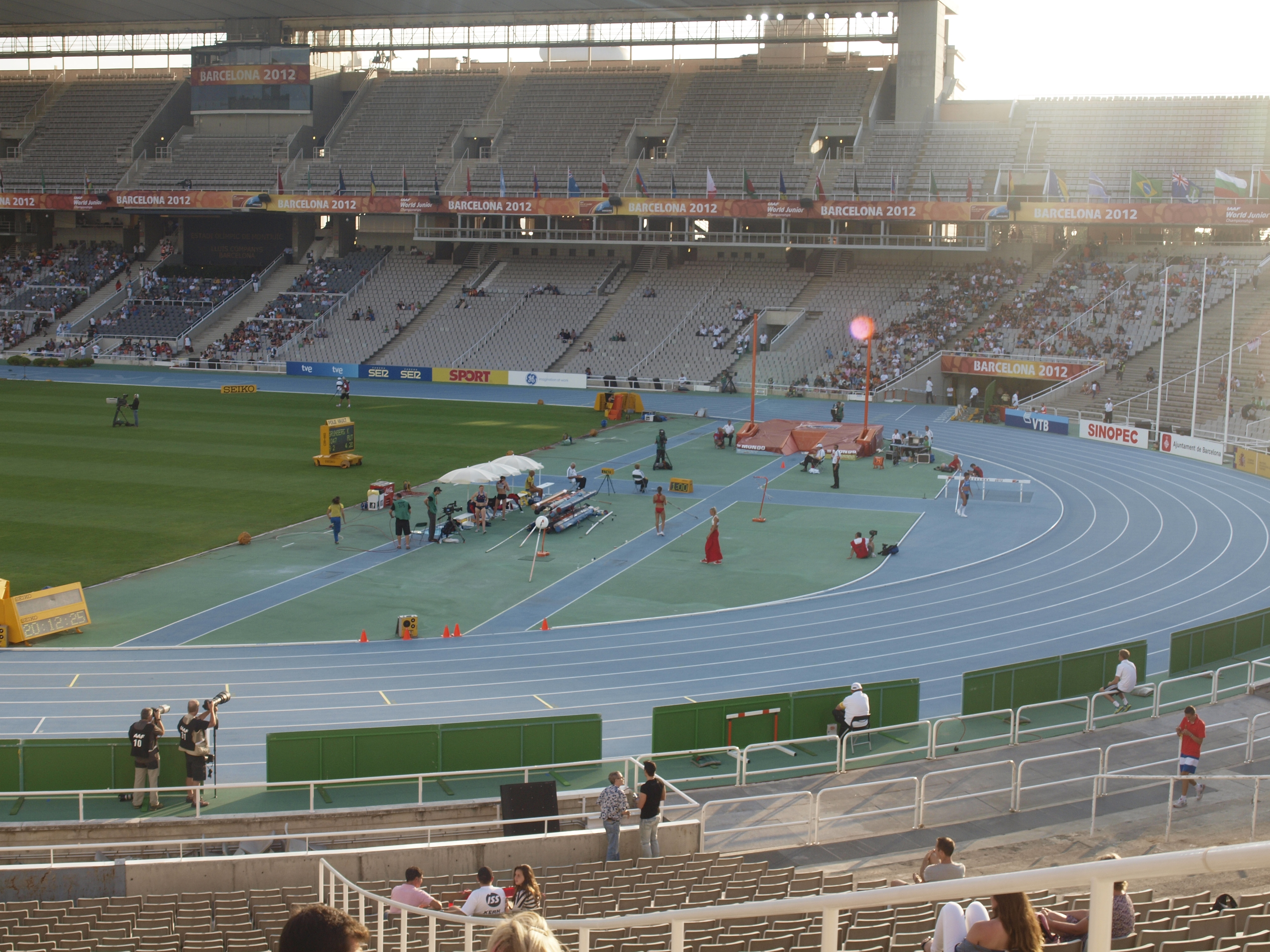
From the pole vault

=== Qualification ===
Qualification: Standard 4.10 m (Q) or at least best 12 qualified (q)

Rank	Group	Name	Nationality	3.65	3.85	3.95	4.05	4.10	Result	Note
1	A	Alissa Söderberg	Sweden	–	o	o	o	o	4.10	Q
1	B	Angelica Bengtsson	Sweden	–	–	–	–	o	4.10	Q
1	B	Emily Grove	United States	–	o	o	o	o	4.10	Q
1	A	Ganna Shelekh	Ukraine	–	–	–	o	o	4.10	Q
1	A	Xu Huiqin	China	–	–	o	–	o	4.10	Q
1	B	Natalya Demidenko	Russia	–	–	o	–	o	4.10	Q
7	B	Anjuli Knäsche	Germany	–	xo	o	xo	o	4.10	Q
8	A	Lilli Schnitzerling	Germany	–	o	xo	xo	xo	4.10	Q
9	A	Liz Parnov	Australia	–	–	–	o	xxx	4.05	q
9	A	Roberta Bruni	Italy	–	–	–	o	xxx	4.05	q
11	B	Kira Grünberg	Austria	–	o	xo	xo	xxx	4.05	q, NJ
12	B	Reena Koll	Estonia	xo	xo	xo	xo	xxx	4.05	q
13	B	Sonia Malavisi	Italy	o	o	o	xxo	xxx	4.05	PB
14	A	Kristina Bondarenko	Russia	–	xo	o	xxo	xxx	4.05	
15	A	Seda Firtina	Turkey	xo	xo	o	xxx		3.95	NJ
16	B	Iryna Yakaltsevich	Belarus	o	o	xo	xxx		3.95	
17	B	Clara Amat	Spain	xo	o	xo	xxx		3.95	
18	A	Yeoryía Stefanídi	Greece	o	xo	xxo	xxx		3.95	
18	B	Buse Arikazan	Turkey	o	xo	xxo	xxx		3.95	NJ
20	A	Sydney White	United States	o	o	xxx			3.85	
21	A	Diamara Planell	Puerto Rico	xo	o	xxx			3.85	
21	A	Enna Hassinen	Finland	xo	o	xxx			3.85	
21	B	Paris McCathrion	Australia	xo	o	xxx			3.85	
24	A	Maialen Axpe	Spain	xo	xo	xxx			3.85	
25	B	Alysha Newman	Canada	o	xxx				3.65	
	B	Jasmine Moser	Switzerland	xxx					NM	
	B	Katie Byres	Great Britain	–	–	–	xxx		NM	
	B	Olga Zyuzina	Ukraine	–	xxx				NM	
	A	Choi Yee-un	South Korea	xxx					NM	

=== Final ===
Rank	Name	Nationality	3.80	3.95	4.05	4.15	4.20	4.25	4.30	4.35	4.40	4.45	4.50	4.60	Result	Notes
1st place, gold medalist(s)	Angelica Bengtsson	Sweden	–	–	–	–	–	o	–	o	–	–	xo	xxx	4.50	CR
2nd place, silver medalist(s)	Liz Parnov	Australia	–	–	–	–	xxo	–	o	–					4.30	
3rd place, bronze medalist(s)	Roberta Bruni	Italy	–	–	xo	xxo	xxo	xxx							4.20	
4	Kira Grünberg	Austria	xxo	o	o	o	xxx								4.15	NJ
4	Anjuli Knäsche	Germany	o	xo	xo	o	xx-	x							4.15	
6	Emily Grove	United States	o	xo	o	xo	xxx								4.15	
7	Alissa Söderberg	Sweden	o	o	o	xxo	xxx								4.15	
8	Xu Huiqin	China	–	–	o	xxx									4.05	
9	Lilli Schnitzerling	Germany	xo	xxo	xxx										3.95	
10	Reena Koll	Estonia	o	xxx											3.80	
	Natalya Demidenko	Russia	–	–	xxx										NM	
	Ganna Shelekh	Ukraine	–	–	–	xxx									NM	

== Participation ==
According to an unofficial count, 29 athletes from 20 countries participated in the event.

- Australia (2)
- Austria (1)
- Belarus (1)
- Canada (1)
- China (1)
- Estonia (1)
- Finland (1)
- Germany (2)
- Greece (1)
- Italy (2)
- Puerto Rico (1)
- Russia (2)
- South Korea (1)
- Spain (2)
- Sweden (2)
- Switzerland (1)
- Turkey (2)
- Ukraine (2)
- United Kingdom (1)
- United States (2)
