= 2012 British Indoor Athletics Championships =

- Dates: 11–12 February
- Host city: Sheffield
- Venue: EIS Sheffield
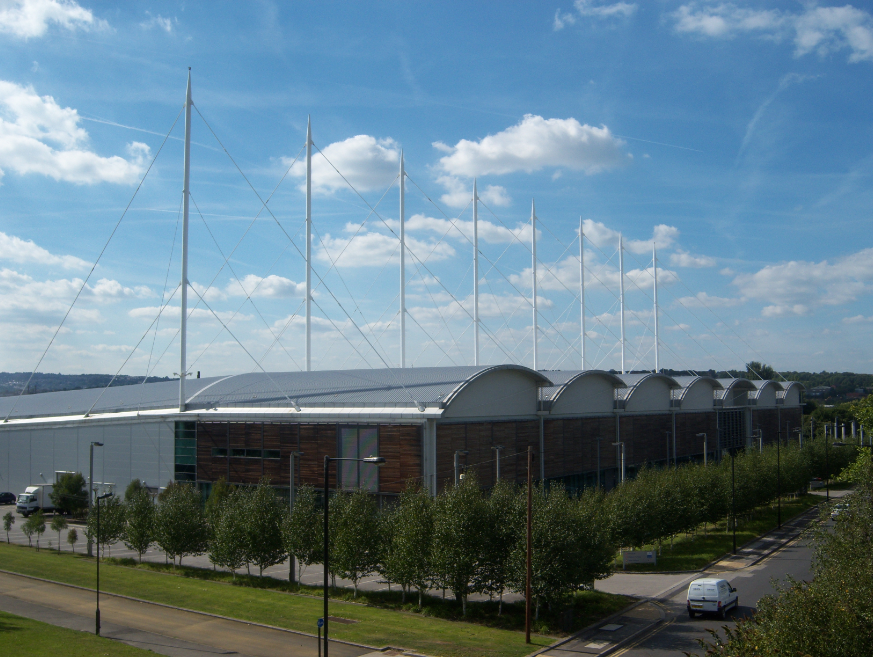
- Level: Senior national
- Type: Indoor
- Events: 24

The 2012 British Indoor Athletics Championships was the sixth edition of the national championship in indoor track and field for the United Kingdom. It was held from 11–12 February 2012 at the English Institute of Sport, Sheffield, England. A total of 24 events (divided evenly between the sexes) were contested over the two-day competition. It served as a selection meeting for the 2012 IAAF World Indoor Championships.

== Results ==
=== Men ===
Event	Gold		Silver		Bronze	
60 metres	Dwain Chambers	6.58	Andrew Robertson	6.61	Harry Aikines-Aryeetey	6.65
200 metres	Sven Knipphals; Germany	21.36	Dannish Walker-Khan	21.65	Roy Ejiakuekwu	22.01
400 metres	Nigel Levine	46.58	Michael Bingham	47.07	Richard Buck	47.10
800 metres	Joe Thomas	1:47.26	Guy Learmonth	1:49.63	Ed Aston	1:49.73
1500 metres	Lewis Moses	3:45.58	James Brewer	3:45.66	Frank Baddick	3:46.88
3000 metres	Jonathan Mellor	7:58.36	Stephen Davies	7:58.78	Mark Mitchell	7:59.00
60 m hurdles	Andrew Pozzi	7.62	Gianni Frankis	7.72	Julian Adeniran	7.84
High jump	Samson Oni	2.26 m	Robbie Grabarz	2.23 m	Robert Wolski; Poland	2.20 m
Pole vault	Andrew Sutcliffe	5.55 m	Steven Lewis	5.45 m	Max Eaves	5.45 m
Long jump	JJ Jegede	7.96 m	Ezekiel Ewulo	7.75 m	Matthew Burton	7.57 m
Triple jump	Nick Thomas; Jamaica	16.18 m	Kola Adedoyin	15.93 m	Michael Puplampu	15.61 m
Shot put	Scott Rider	18.28 m	Zane Duquemin	17.24 m	Ryan Spencer Jones	17.22 m

=== Women ===
Event	Gold		Silver		Bronze	
60 metres	Jeanette Kwakye	7.20	Jodie Williams	7.29	Laura Turner	7.31
200 metres	Margaret Adeoye	23.36	Louise Bloor	23.74	Katherine Endacott	24.55
400 metres	Shana Cox	52.38	Nadine Okyere	53.01	Nicola Sanders	53.11
800 metres	Marilyn Okoro	2:04.01	Tara Bird	2:05.00	Charlotte Best	2:05.25
1500 metres	Claire Gibson	4:17.38	Charlotte Arter	4:24.75	Laura Dunn	4:25.62
3000 metres	Hannah England	9:06.04	Katrina Wootton	9:06.99	Elle Baker	9:09.43
60 m hurdles	Jessica Ennis	7.95	Gemma Bennett	8.22	Louise Wood	8.23
High jump	Jessica Ennis	1.91 m	Emma Perkins	1.89 m	Isobel Pooley	1.82 m
Pole vault	Holly Bleasdale	4.70 m	Katie Byres	4.37 m	Sally Peake	4.27 m
Long jump	Shara Proctor	6.68 m	Abigail Irozuru	6.44 m	Gemma Weetman	6.21 m
Triple jump	Yamilé Aldama	14.09 m	Nadia Williams	13.53 m	Yasmine Regis	13.50 m
Shot put	Eden Francis	16.72 m	Shaunagh Brown	15.77 m	Eleanor Gatrell	15.36 m
