= Michaela Meijer =

Swedish pole vaulter

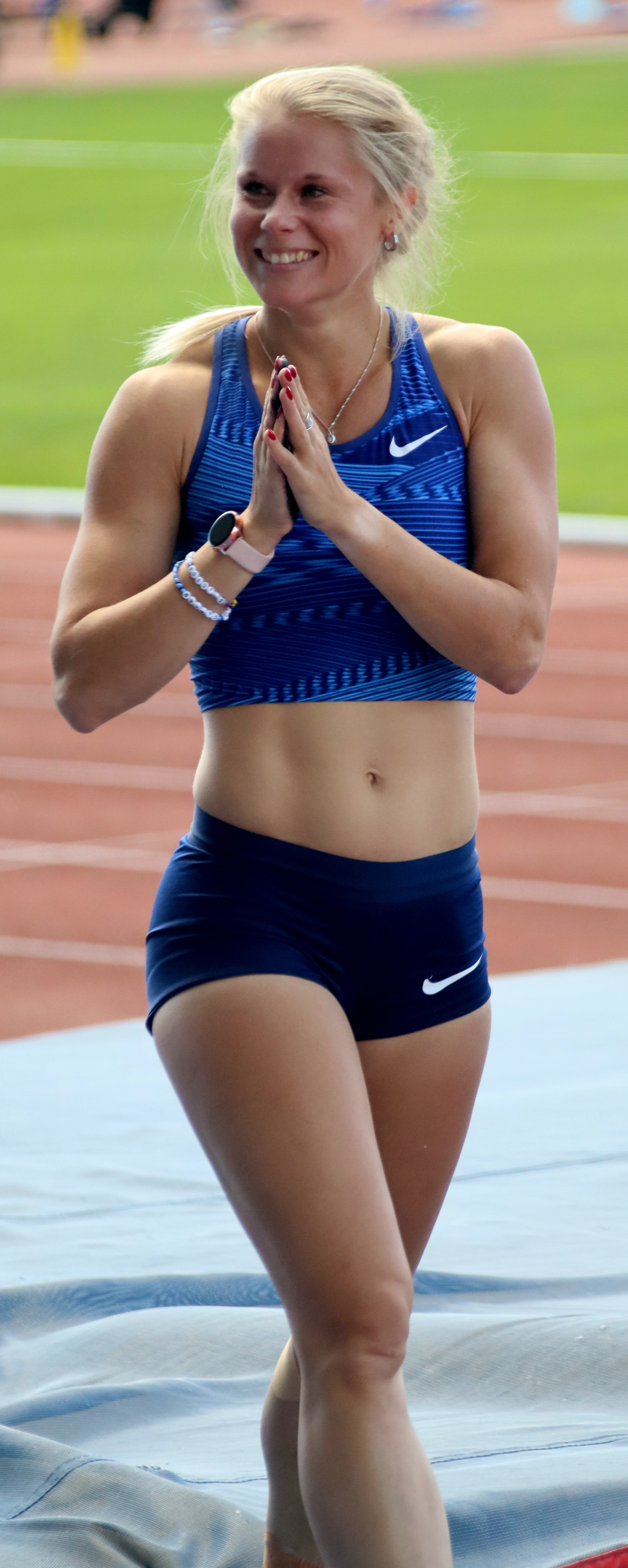
- Michaela Meijer at the 2019 Birmingham Grand Prix

Personal information
- Full name: Sara Michaela Meijer
- Born: 30 July 1993 (age 33) Gothenburg, Sweden
- Height: 1.72 m (5 ft 8 in)
- Weight: 60 kg (132 lb)

Sport
- Country: Sweden
- Sport: Track and field
- Event: Pole vault
- Club: Örgryte IS
- Coached by: Gustaf Hultgren, Thomas Kyöttilä

Achievements and titles
- Personal bests: outdoor: 4.83 m (2020) indoor: 4.75 m (2019)
- Updated on 1 August 2020

Michaela Meijer (born 30 July 1993) is a Swedish athlete who specialises in the pole vault. She competed at the 2015 World Championships in Beijing, reaching the final. In 2016, Meijer competed at the Olympic Games in Rio de Janeiro, but was eliminated in the qualification round, finishing 17th with 4.45 meters. In addition she won silver medals at the 2009 World Youth Championships and the 2015 European U23 Championships, both times finishing behind her compatriot, Angelica Bengtsson. Her personal bests in the event are 4.83 metres outdoors (Norrköping, 2020), which is also the Swedish record and 4.75 metres indoors (Bærum 2019).

== Competition record ==
| Year | Competition | Venue | Position | Notes |
Representing Sweden
| 2009 | World Youth Championships | Brixen, Italy | 2nd | 4.10 m |
| 2010 | World Junior Championships | Moncton, Canada | 13th | NM |
| 2011 | European Junior Championships | Tallinn, Estonia | 13th (q) | 4.00 m |
| 2015 | European Indoor Championships | Prague, Czech Republic | 9th (q) | 4.55 m |
| 2015 | European U23 Championships | Tallinn, Estonia | 2nd | 4.50 m |
| 2015 | World Championships | Beijing, China | 13th | NM |
| 2016 | European Championships | Amsterdam, Netherlands | 5th | 4.55 m |
| 2016 | Olympic Games | Rio de Janeiro, Brazil | 17th (q) | 4.45 m |
| 2017 | European Indoor Championships | Belgrade, Serbia | 5th | 4.55 m |
| 2017 | World Championships | London, United Kingdom | – | NM |
| 2019 | European Indoor Championships | Glasgow, United Kingdom | 8th | 4.45 m |
| 2019 | World Championships | Doha, Qatar | 25th (q) | 4.35 m |
| 2021 | European Indoor Championships | Toruń, Poland | 9th | 4.35 m |
| 2021 | Olympic Games | Tokyo, Japan | 16th (q) | 4.40 m |
| 2023 | European Indoor Championships | Istanbul, Turkey | 7th | 4.45 m |
| 2023 | World Championships | Budapest, Hungary | 17th (q) | 4.50 m |

(q = qualification round)
