= Katie Byres =

British athlete

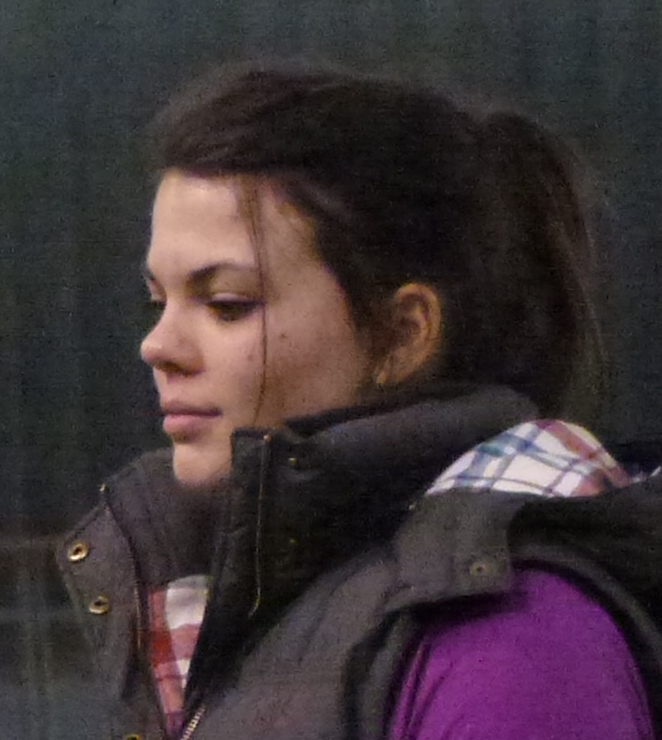
Byres at a competition in France in 2012

Katie Byres (born 11 September 1993) is a British former track and field athlete who competed in the pole vault. She holds a personal best of 4.52 m (14 ft 9 3/4 in) for the event, set in Nevers, France on 18 February 2012. Her highest national ranking during her career was third in 2012. She also ranked 16th in the world in the 2012 indoor season. She broke the British under-20 records for pole vault, indoors and outdoors.

Born in Chesterfield, Byres is a member of Sale Harriers Manchester. She became interested in pole vaulting after watching the 2004 Olympic pole vault final on television. She began travelling to Sportcity in Manchester to train for the event. She was coached until 2013 by Julien Raffalli-Ebezant, who also coached national record breaker Holly Bradshaw. After then, she began training with Kate Rooney – herself a former pole vaulter. In 2008 Byres won the England Open Athletics Championships and placed fifth at the 2009 British Athletics Championships the following year, still aged 15. She later managed runner-up performances at the 2012 British Indoor Athletics Championships, 2013 British Indoor Athletics Championships and 2014 British Athletics Championships.

In international age category competitions she placed tenth at the 2009 European Youth Olympic Festival, won the B-final of the pole vault at the 2010 Summer Youth Olympics, and came ninth at the 2013 European Athletics U23 Championships.

She was also a participant at the 2012 World Junior Championships in Athletics, 2012 IAAF World Indoor Championships, and 2014 Commonwealth Games, but failed to record a valid height at any of the competitions.

She retired from competitive pole vaulting after January 2015. Following her pole vault career, Byres attended Nottingham Trent University, completing a degree in Events Management, and worked for Young Enterprise.

== International competitions ==
Representing the United Kingdom
Year	Competition	Venue	Position	Event	Result	Notes
2009	European Youth Olympic Festival	Tampere, Finland	10th	Pole vault	3.40 m	
2010	Youth Olympics	Bishan, Singapore	1st (B final)	Pole vault	4.00 m	
2012	World Indoor Championships	Istanbul, Turkey	—	Pole vault	NM	
2012	World Junior Championships	Barcelona, Spain	—	Pole vault	NM	
2013	European U23 Championships	Tampere, Finland	9th	Pole vault	4.15 m	
2014	Commonwealth Games	Glasgow, United Kingdom	—	Pole vault	NM	

== Seasonal bests ==
View chart definition.
