= 2018 IAAF World Indoor Championships – Women's pole vault =

Women's pole vault at the 2018 IAAF World Indoor Championships
- Venue: Arena Birmingham
- Dates: 3 March
- Competitors: 12 from 10 nations

Medalists
gold medal	Sandi Morris	United States
silver medal	Anzhelika Sidorova	Authorised Neutral Athletes
bronze medal	Katerina Stefanidi	Greece

The women's pole vault at the 2018 IAAF World Indoor Championships took place on 3 March 2018.

== Summary ==
With only 12 entrants, no preliminary round was held. Six women cleared 4.70 m, with Anzhelika Sidorova remaining perfect, and Olympic champion Katerina Stefanidi using it as her opening height. Sidorova passed at 4.75 m, while Eliza McCartney then Sandi Morris cleared on their first attempts, Morris taking the lead on fewer misses. Stefanidi cleared on her second attempt to take over third place, so Katie Nageotte passed, while Alysha Newman took her three misses and exited. Sidorova retook the lead, clearing 4.80 m, while Morris and Stefanidi cleared it on their last attempts. McCartney and Nageotte exited. Morris and Stefanidi missed their first attempts then passed after Sidorova remained perfect over 4.85 m. With only two attempts left, Morris cleared on her last attempt at 4.90 m to stay in the competition. Stefanidi missed and settled for the bronze. Sidorova cleared on her third attempt but relinquished the lead. At a championship record 4.95 m (16 ft 2 3/4 in), neither could get over on their first two attempts, but then Morris cleared on her final attempt, which turned into gold when Sidorova missed her third. Still in the competition, Morris had the bar raised to a world record 5.04 m (16 ft 6 1/4 in). Surrounded by the drama of the men's 60 metres, Morris made two credible attempts at the record, the last more than 3 hours and 15 minutes after warming up at the beginning of the competition.

== Records ==
Standing records prior to the 2018 IAAF World Indoor Championships
World record	Jenn Suhr (USA)	5.02	Albuquerque, United States	2 March 2013
Championship record	Jenn Suhr (USA)	4.90	Portland, United States	17 March 2016
World Leading	Katie Nageotte (USA)	4.91	Albuquerque, United States	18 February 2018
African record	Elmarie Gerryts (RSA)	4.41	Birmingham, Great Britain	20 February 2000
Asian record	Li Ling (CHN)	4.70	Doha, Qatar	19 February 2016
European record	Elena Isinbaeva (RUS)	5.01	Stockholm, Sweden	23 February 2012
North and Central American and Caribbean record	Jenn Suhr (USA)	5.02	Albuquerque, United States	2 March 2013
Oceanian record	Kym Howe (AUS)	4.72	Donetsk, Ukraine	10 February 2007
South American record	Fabiana Murer (BRA)	4.83	Nevers, France	7 February 2015

== Results ==
The final was started at 18:00.

Rank	Athlete	Nationality	4.35	4.50	4.60	4.70	4.75	4.80	4.85	4.90	4.95	5.04	Result	Notes
1st place, gold medalist(s)	Sandi Morris	United States	–	o	o	xo	o	xxo	x–	xo	xxo	xxx	4.95	CR, WL
2nd place, silver medalist(s)	Anzhelika Sidorova	Authorised Neutral Athletes	–	–	o	o	–	o	o	xxo	xxx		4.90	PB
3rd place, bronze medalist(s)	Katerina Stefanidi	Greece	–	–	–	o	xo	xxo	x–	xx			4.80	
4	Eliza McCartney	New Zealand	o	xo	o	xxo	o	xxx					4.75	AR
5	Katie Nageotte	United States	–	xo	o	xo	x–	xx					4.70	
6	Alysha Newman	Canada	o	o	xxo	xxo	xxx						4.70	NR
7	Yarisley Silva	Cuba	o	xo	o	xxx							4.60	SB
8	Nina Kennedy	Australia	xo	xo	o	xxx							4.60	
9	Olga Mullina	Authorised Neutral Athletes	o	xo	xxo	xxx							4.60	PB
10	Ninon Guillon-Romarin	France	o	o	xxx								4.50	
11	Angelica Bengtsson	Sweden	o	xo	xxx								4.50	SB
	Lisa Ryzih	Germany	–	xxx									NM	
