= Angelina Zhuk-Krasnova =

Russian pole vaulter (born 1991)

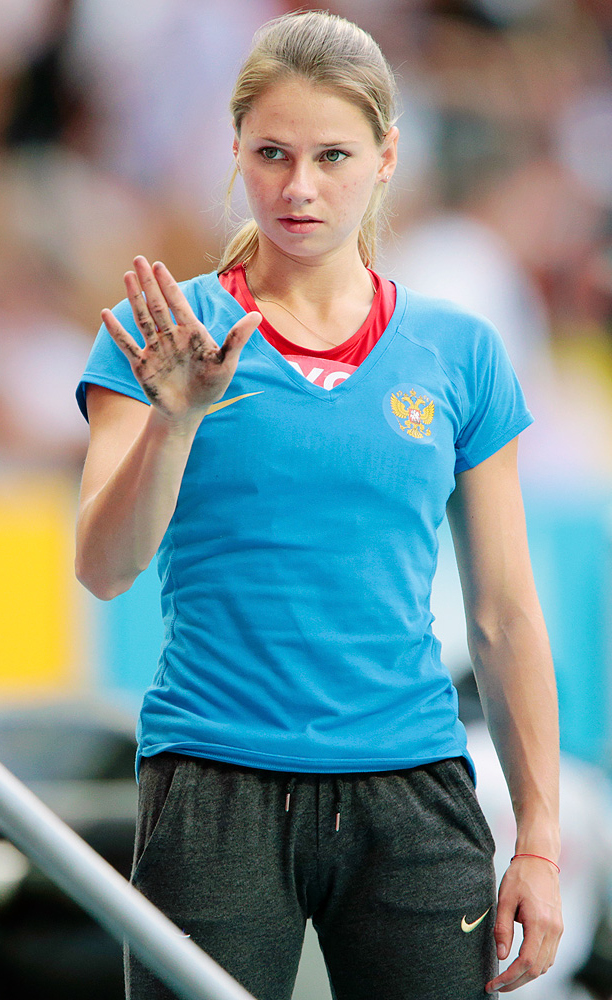

Personal information
- Nationality: Russian, Moldovan (since 2022)
- Born: 7 February 1991 (age 35)

Sport
- Sport: Track and field
- Event: Pole vault

Achievements and titles
- Personal best(s): Outdoor: 4.70 m (2013); Indoor: 4.67 m (2015)
Medal record
Women's athletics
Representing Russia
European Championships
| Bronze medal – third place | 2014 Zürich | Pole vault |
European U23 Championships
| Gold medal – first place | 2013 Tampere | Pole vault |

Angelina Zhuk-Krasnova (Russian: Ангели́на Серге́евна Жук-Красно́ва, IPA: [ɐnɡʲɪˈlʲinə sʲɪrˈɡʲe(j)ɪvnə ʐuk krɐsˈnovə]; born 7 February 1991) is a Russian athlete specialising in the pole vault. She finished seventh at the 2013 World Championships. She is also the 2013 European U23 Champion.

She has personal bests of 4.70 metres outdoors set in 2013 and 4.67 metres indoors set in 2015. She will represent Moldova at international competitions.

== International competitions ==
| Year | Competition | Venue | Position | Event | Notes |
Representing Russia
| 2013 | European Indoor Championships | Gothenburg, Sweden | 5th | Pole vault | 4.37 m |
| 2013 | European U23 Championships | Tampere, Finland | 1st | Pole vault | 4.70 m |
| 2013 | World Championships | Moscow, Russia | 7th | Pole vault | 4.65 m |
| 2014 | European Championships | Zürich, Switzerland | 3rd | Pole vault | 4.60 m |
| 2015 | European Indoor Championships | Prague, Czech Republic | 4th | Pole vault | 4.60 m |
Representing Moldova
| 2022 | Championships of the Small States of Europe | Marsa, Malta | 1st | Pole vault | 3.80 m |
| 2022 | Championships of the Small States of Europe | Marsa, Malta | 9th | Long jump | 5.26 m |
