= Anzhelika Sidorova =

Russian pole vaulter (born 1991)

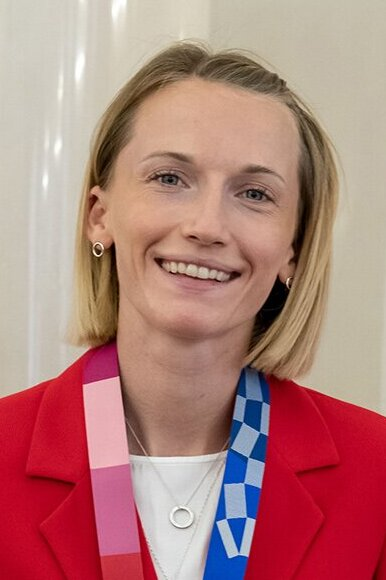
- Sidorova in 2021

Personal information
- Nationality: Russian
- Born: 28 June 1991 (age 35) Moscow, Russia
- Height: 170 cm (5 ft 7 in)
- Weight: 52 kg (115 lb)

Sport
- Country: Russia
- Sport: Athletics
- Event: Pole vault

Achievements and titles
- Personal bests: Outdoor: 5.01 m (2021); Indoor: 4.95 m (2020)
Medal record
Representing ROC
Olympic Games
Silver medal – second place	2020 Tokyo	Pole vault
Representing Authorised Neutral Athletes
World Championships
Gold medal – first place	2019 Doha	Pole vault
World Indoor Championships
Silver medal – second place	2018 Birmingham	Pole vault
European Indoor Championships
Gold medal – first place	2019 Glasgow	Pole vault
Representing Russia
World Indoor Championships
Silver medal – second place	2014 Sopot	Pole vault
European Championships
Gold medal – first place	2014 Zürich	Pole vault
European Indoor Championships
Gold medal – first place	2015 Praha	Pole vault
Bronze medal – third place	2013 Gothenburg	Pole vault
Representing Europe
Continental Cup
Gold medal – first place	2018 Ostrava	Pole Vault

Anzhelika Aleksandrovna Sidorova (Russian: Анжелика Александровна Сидорова, IPA: [ɐnʐɨˈlʲikə ˈsʲidərəvə]; born 28 June 1991) is a former Russian pole vaulter. Sidorova won a gold medal at the 2019 World Championships and a silver medal at the 2020 Summer Olympics. She also won silver medals at the 2014 IAAF World Indoor Championships and 2013 European Athletics U23 Championships, and a bronze medal at the 2013 European Athletics Indoor Championships.

Sidorova's personal best is 5.01 m, set at the 2021 Zurich Diamond League finals, becoming one of only four women in the world to clear 5 metres outdoors. She announced her retirement in 2023.

== International competitions ==
Year	Competition	Venue	Position	Notes
Representing Russia
2010	World Junior Championships	Moncton, Canada	4th	4.05 m
2013	European Indoor Championships	Gothenburg, Sweden	3rd	4.62 m
2013	European U23 Championships	Tampere, Finland	2nd	4.60 m
2014	World Indoor Championships	Sopot, Poland	2nd	4.70 m
2014	European Championships	Zürich, Switzerland	1st	4.65 m
2015	European Indoor Championships	Prague, Czech Republic	1st	4.80 m
2015	World Championships	Beijing, China	–	NM
Representing Authorized Neutral Athletes
2017	World Championships	London, United Kingdom	–	NM
2018	World Indoor Championships	Birmingham, United Kingdom	2nd	4.90 m
2018	European Championships	Berlin, Germany	4th	4.70 m
2018	Continental Cup	Ostrava, Czech Republic	1st	4.85 m (CR)
2019	European Indoor Championships	Glasgow, United Kingdom	1st	4.85 m
2019	World Championships	Doha, Qatar	1st	4.95 m
2021	Olympic Games	Tokyo, Japan	2nd	4.85 m
2021	Diamond League	Zurich, Switzerland	1st	details

== Awards ==
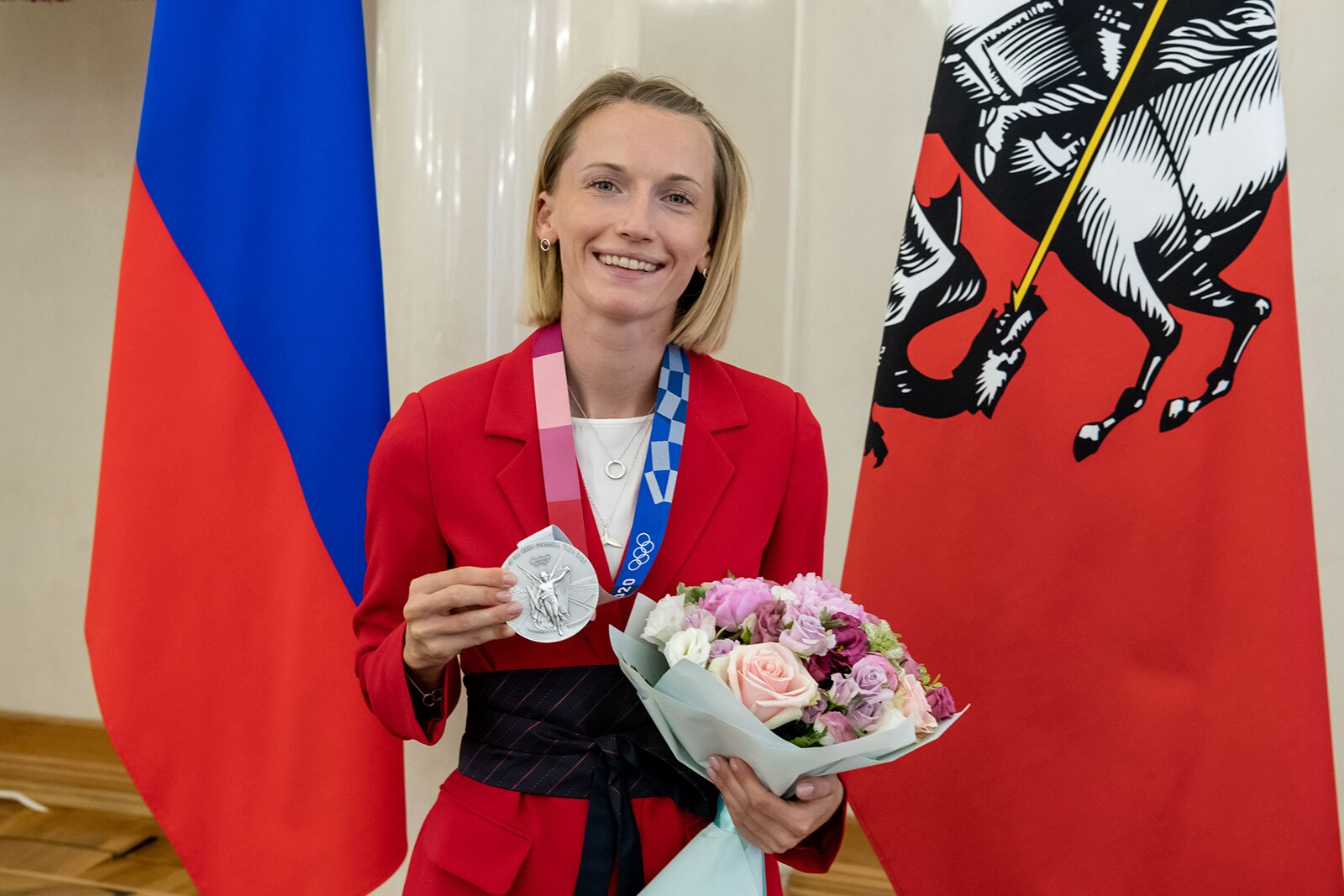
Sidorova at the state reception by Vladimir Putin in 2021

- In the 2020 edition of the national sports award Pride of Russia, in the nomination Sportswoman of the Year

== See also ==
- Five metres club
