= Gina Reuland =

Luxembourgish pole vaulter

Medal record

Women's athletics

Representing Luxembourg

3rd League European Team Championships
Silver medal – second place	2011 Reykjavík	Pole Vault

Games of the Small States of Europe
Gold medal – first place	2013 Luxembourg	Pole Vault

Gina Reuland (born 28 August 1992) is a track and field pole vaulter who competes internationally for Luxembourg

Her personal best is 4.30 m, which is national record for Luxembourg.

== Achievements ==
Year	Competition	Venue	Position	Notes
Representing Luxembourg
2007	Games of the Small States of Europe	Fontvieille, Monaco	3rd	3.50 m
2011	3rd League European Team Championships	Reykjavík, Iceland	2nd	3.75 m
2011	European Junior Championships	Tallinn, Estonia	15th	4.00 m
2012	European Championships	Helsinki, Finland	28th (q)	3.80 m
2013	Games of the Small States of Europe	Luxembourg, Luxembourg	1st	4.00 m
2013	European U23 Championships	Tampere, Finland	18th (q)	4.05 m
2015	European Indoor Championships	Prague, Czech Republic	20th (q)	4.30 m
2015	Games of the Small States of Europe	Reykjavík, Iceland	1st	4.30 m
2015	Universiade	Gwangju, South Korea	9th	4.05 m
