= Maialen Axpe =

Spanish pole vaulter

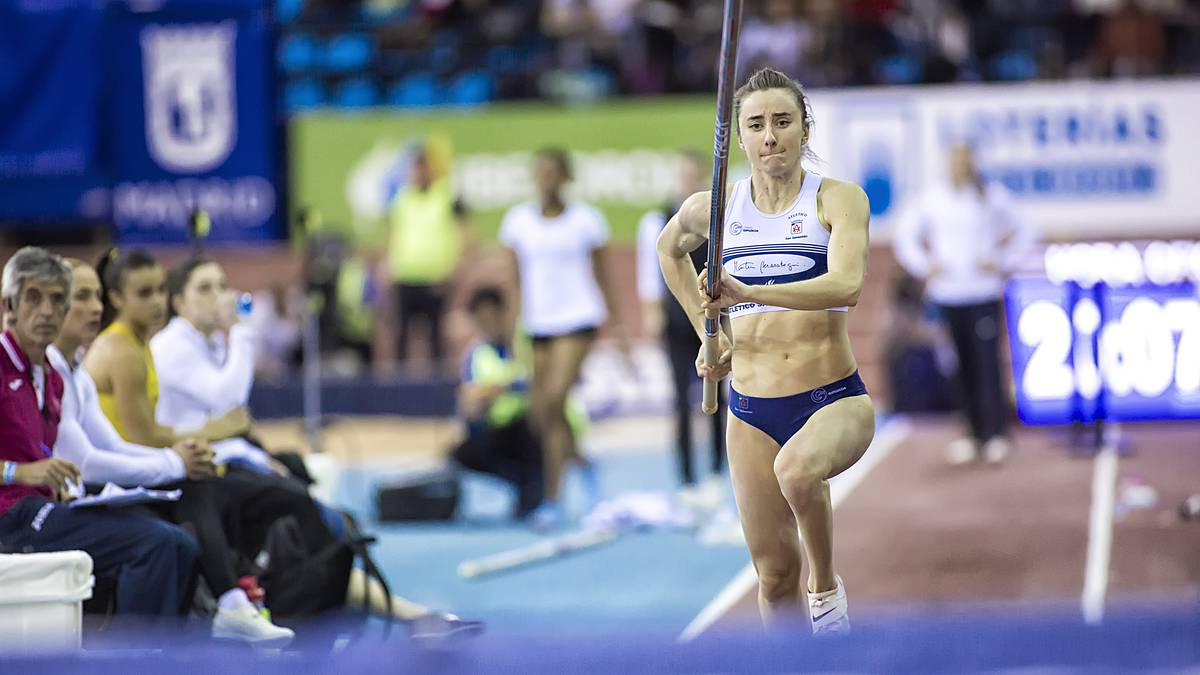

Personal information
- Full name: Maialen Axpe Etxabe
- Born: 4 May 1993 (age 33) Mondragón, Basque Country, Spain
- Height: 1.70 m (5 ft 7 in)
- Weight: 56 kg (123 lb)

Sport
- Sport: Athletics
- Event: Pole vault
- Club: Atlético San Sebastián
- Coached by: Francisco Javier Hernández

Maialen Axpe Etxabe (born 4 May 1993) is a Basque athlete specialising in the pole vault. She won a silver medal at the 2018 Ibero-American Championships.

Her personal bests in the event are 4.45 metres outdoors (Getafe 2018) and 4.50 metres indoors (Antequera 2019).

== International competitions ==
Year	Competition	Venue	Position	Notes
Representing Spain
2012	World Junior Championships	Barcelona, Spain	24th (q)	3.85 m
2013	European U23 Championships	Tampere, Finland	24th (q)	3.70 m
2014	Mediterranean U23 Championships	Aubagne, France	—	NM
2015	European U23 Championships	Tallinn, Estonia	17th (q)	4.00 m
2018	Mediterranean Games	Tarragona, Spain	10th	4.01 m
2018	European Championships	Berlin, Germany	19th (q)	4.35 m
2018	Ibero-American Championships	Trujillo, Peru	2nd	4.20 m
2019	European Indoor Championships	Glasgow, United Kingdom	17th (q)	4.25 m
2023	European Games	Chorzów, Poland	16th	4.25
