= 2019 European Athletics Indoor Championships – Women's pole vault =

The women's pole vault event at the 2019 European Athletics Indoor Championships was held on 2 March at 10:03 (qualification) and 3 March at 18:05 (final) local time.

== Medalists ==
Gold	Silver	Bronze
Anzhelika Sidorova; Authorised Neutral Athletes	Holly Bradshaw; Great Britain	Nikoleta Kyriakopoulou; Greece

== Records ==
Standing records prior to the 2019 European Athletics Indoor Championships
World record	Jenn Suhr (USA)	5.02	Albuquerque, United States	2 March 2013
European record	Yelena Isinbayeva (RUS)	5.01	Stockholm, Sweden	23 February 2012
Championship record	Yelena Isinbayeva (RUS)	4.90	Madrid, Spain	6 March 2005
World Leading	Anzhelika Sidorova (ANA)	4.91	Madrid, Spain	8 February 2019
European Leading	Anzhelika Sidorova (ANA)	4.91	Madrid, Spain	8 February 2019

== Results ==
=== Qualification ===
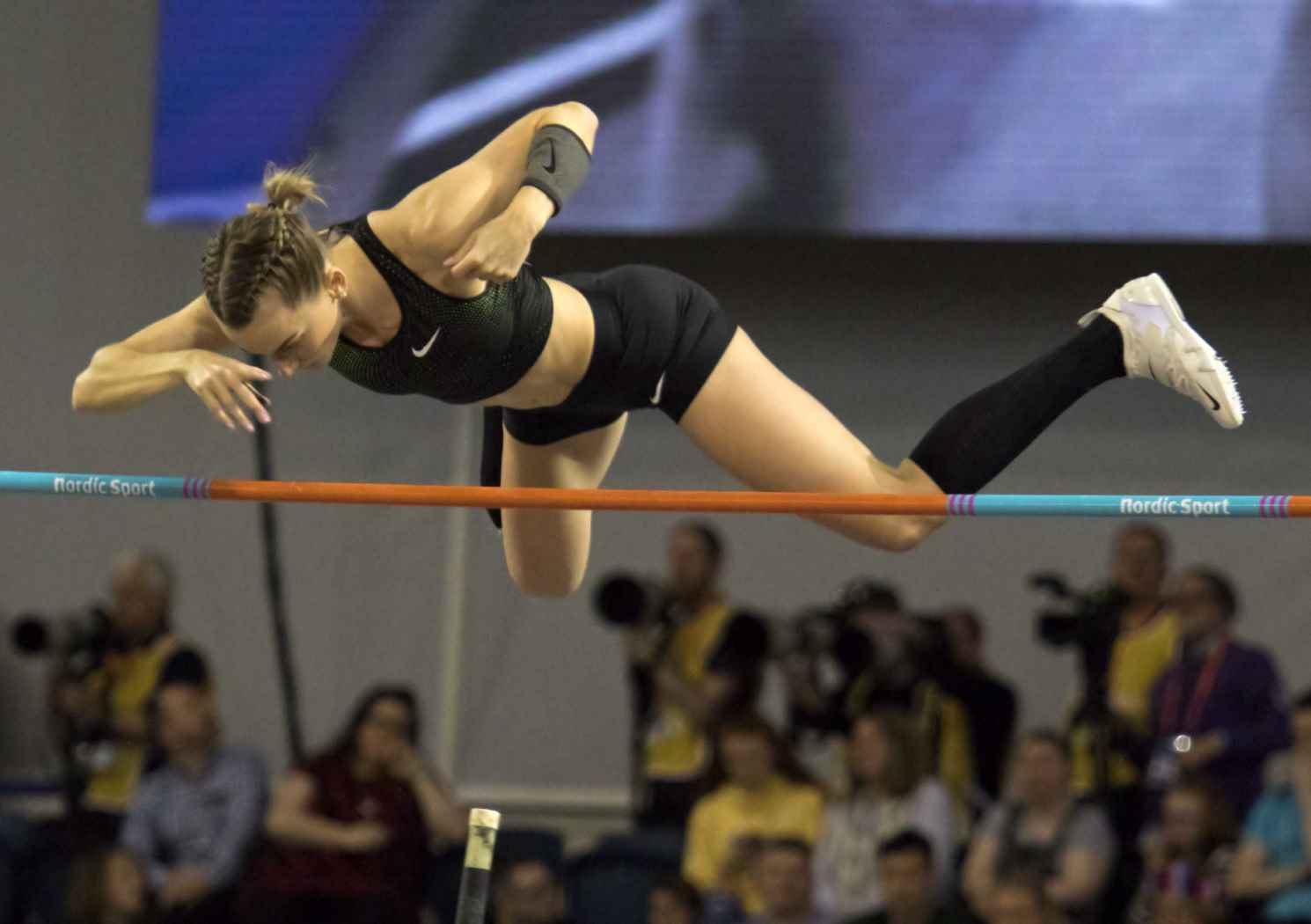
Gold medal winner, Anzhelika Sidorova

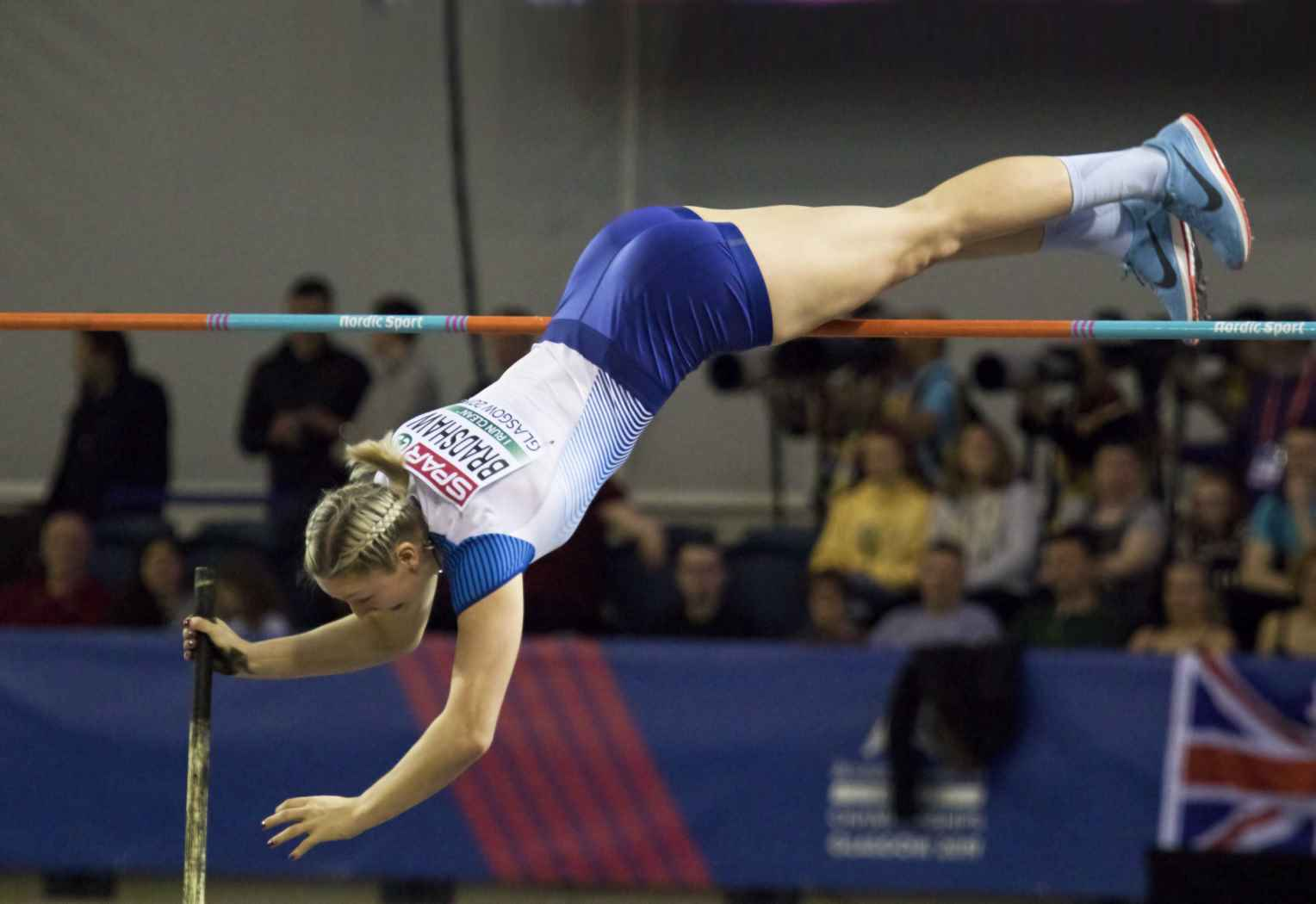
Silver medallist, Holly Bradshaw

Qualification: Qualifying performance 4.65 (Q) or at least 8 best performers (q) advance to the Final

Rank	Athlete	Nationality	4.10	4.25	4.40	4.50	4.60	Result	Note
1	Anzhelika Sidorova	Authorised Neutral Athletes	–	–	–	ο	ο	4.60	q
1	Katerina Stefanidi	Greece	–	–	–	–	ο	4.60	q
1	Iryna Zhuk	Belarus	–	–	o	o	ο	4.60	q
4	Michaela Meijer	Sweden	–	–	xo	–	o	4.60	q
5	Angelica Moser	Switzerland	–	xo	o	xo	o	4.60	q
6	Ninon Guillon-Romarin	France	–	–	o	o	xo	4.60	q
7	Nikoleta Kyriakopoulou	Greece	–	–	xo	xxo	xxo	4.60	q
8	Holly Bradshaw	Great Britain	–	–	–	o	xxr	4.50	q
9	Sonia Malavisi	Italy	xo	o	xo	o	xxx	4.50	=PB
10	Tina Šutej	Slovenia	–	xo	o	xo	xxx	4.50	
11	Olga Mullina	Authorised Neutral Athletes	–	xo	xo	xo	xxx	4.50	=SB
12	Eléni-Klaoúdia Pólak	Greece	xo	xxo	o	xxo	xxx	4.50	=PB
13	Romana Maláčová	Czech Republic	o	xxo	xxo	xxo	xxx	4.50	
14	Katharina Bauer	Germany	–	o	o	xxx		4.40	
14	Angelica Bengtsson	Sweden	–	–	o	xxx		4.40	
16	Amálie Švábíková	Czech Republic	xo	xo	xo	xxx		4.40	
17	Maialen Axpe	Spain	o	xo	xxx			4.25	
18	Wilma Murto	Finland	xo	xxx				4.10	
	Maryna Kylypko	Ukraine						DNS	

=== Final ===
Rank	Athlete	Nationality	4.30	4.45	4.55	4.65	4.75	4.80	4.85	4.92	Result	Note
1st place, gold medalist(s)	Anzhelika Sidorova	Authorised Neutral Athletes	–	–	o	–	o	o	o	xxx	4.85	
2nd place, silver medalist(s)	Holly Bradshaw	Great Britain	–	–	o	xo	o	–	xxx		4.75	
3rd place, bronze medalist(s)	Nikoleta Kyriakopoulou	Greece	–	xo	–	xo	xxx				4.65	
4	Angelica Moser	Switzerland	o	o	o	xxo	xxx				4.65	PB
4	Katerina Stefanidi	Greece	–	–	–	xxo	xxx				4.65	
6	Iryna Zhuk	Belarus	–	o	xo	xxo	xxx				4.65	=NR
7	Ninon Guillon-Romarin	France	–	xxo	xo	xxo	xxx				4.65	
8	Michaela Meijer	Sweden	–	xo	–	xxx					4.45	
