= Athletics at the 2014 Commonwealth Games – Women's pole vault =

Women's pole vault at the Commonwealth Games

The Women's pole vault at the 2014 Commonwealth Games, as part of the athletics programme, was held at Hampden Park on 2 August 2014.

== Records ==
World Record	5.06	Yelena Isinbayeva	RUS	Zurich, Switzerland	28 August 2009
Games Record	4.62	Kym Howe	AUS	Melbourne, Australia	25 March 2006

=== Final ===
Rank	Name	Nationality	3.80	4.00	4.15	4.25	4.35	4.40	4.45	4.50	4.63	Result	Notes
1st place, gold medalist(s)	Alana Boyd	Australia	–	–	xxo	–	o	o	–	o	xxx	4.50	
2nd place, silver medalist(s)	Sally Peake	Wales	–	o	xo	o	x–	xx				4.25	
3rd place, bronze medalist(s)	Alysha Newman	Canada	o	xxx								3.80	
3rd place, bronze medalist(s)	Sally Scott	England	o	xxx								3.80	
—	Zoe Brown	Northern Ireland	xxx									NM	
—	Katie Byres	England	xxx									NM	
—	Olivia Curran	Isle of Man	xxx									NM	
—	Liz Parnov	Australia	xxx									NM	
—	Vicky Parnov	Australia	xxx									NM	
—	Henrietta Paxton	Scotland	xxx									NM	
