= Kira Grünberg =

Austrian politician and former athlete

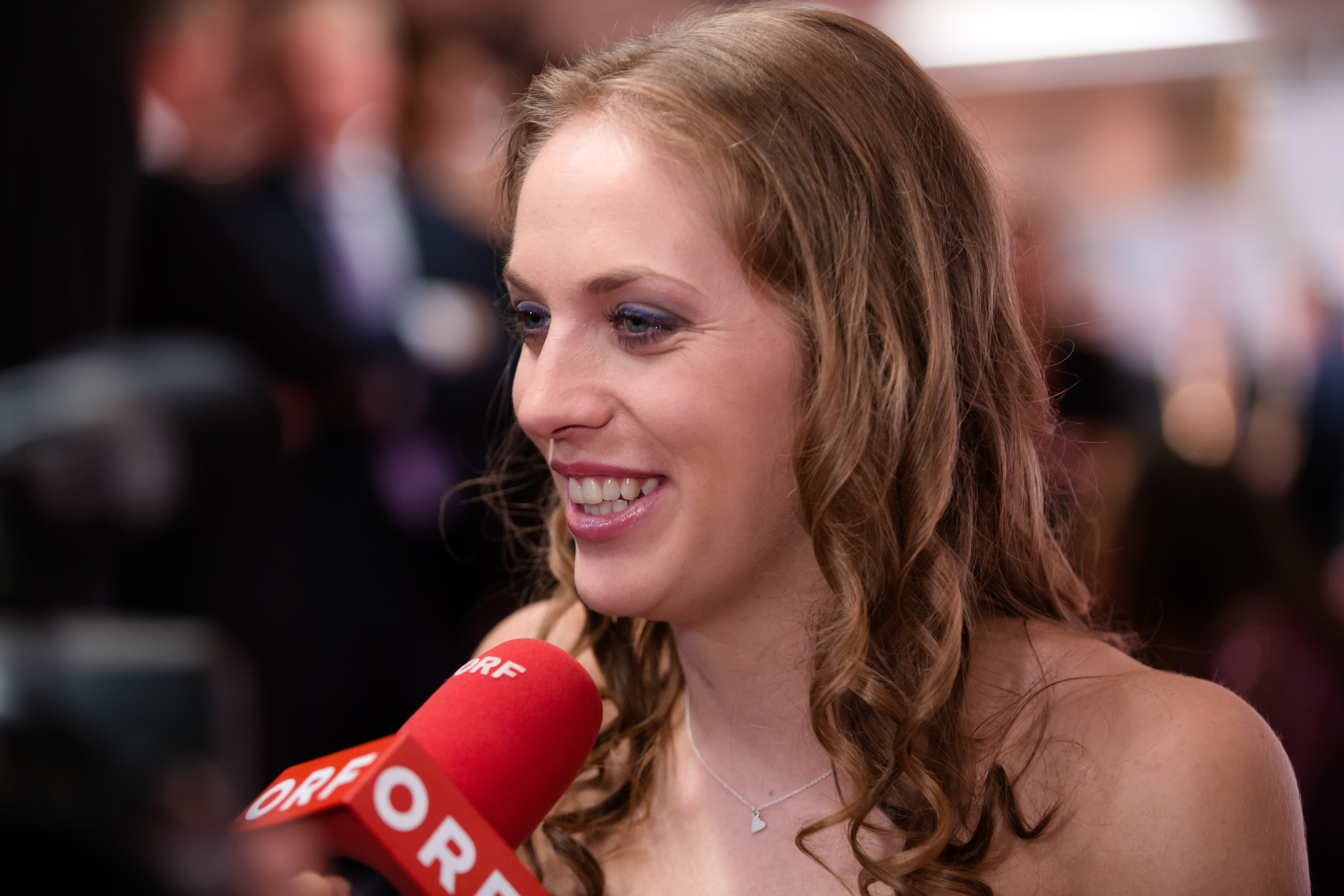
- Kira Grünberg (2015)

Member of the National Council
- Incumbent
- Assumed office 3 July 2025
- Preceded by: Karoline Edtstadler
- In office 9 November 2017 – 23 October 2024
- Constituency: 7 – Tyrol (2017–18); Federal list (2018–24)

Personal details
- Born: 13 August 1993 (age 33) Innsbruck, Austria
- Party: Austrian People's Party (ÖVP)

Military service
- Allegiance: Austria
- Branch/service: Austrian Armed Forces
- Years of service: 2012–2015
- Rank: Korporal
- Sports career
- Height: 1.70 m (5 ft 7 in)
- Weight: 56 kg (123 lb)
- Sport: Track and field
- Event: Pole vault
- Club: ATSV Innsbruck
- Coached by: Frithjof Grünberg, Rainer Schopf

Kira Grünberg (born 13 August 1993 in Innsbruck) is an Austrian politician and former athlete who specialised in the pole vault. During her career, Grünberg represented her country at many international competitions. Her best outings were the fourth place at the 2012 World Junior Championships and 2015 European U23 Championships. In addition, she reached the final at the 2014 European Championships where she, however, did not clear any height.

On 30 July 2015, Grünberg seriously injured her spine, during a training session in her native Innsbruck. During a routine jump, she landed on her head and neck in the box in front of the mat, fracturing her fifth cervical vertebrae. The injury left her a tetraplegic.

Her outdoor and indoor personal best is 4.45 metres set in 2014 and 2015 respectively. These are current national records.

== Life ==
=== Athletic career ===
Grünberg's dream of becoming a professional pole vaulter began when she was seven years old and watched the Olympic Games in Sydney on TV. The pole vaulting competition especially fascinated her. However, at a young age she first started with gymnastics and general athletics and specialized in pole vaulting a few years later. Since she couldn't find a coach for pole vaulting in her hometown Innsbruck, her father Frithjof Grünberg who used to do pole vaulting as a hobby started to coach her. Her father is described as eager to deepen his technical know-how and seeking contact with international experts in pole vaulting and athletics for new training inputs. Later, Rainer Schopf worked with her on her sprinting skills. A few times a year, Grünberg trained with Herbert Czingon, a renowned pole vault coach who coached both the German and the Swiss national team.

In 2012, Grünberg became part of the sports unit of the Austrian army in Innsbruck. Being a sports soldier allowed her to focus on her sports career while receiving government funding. Furthermore, she became part of the "Hope Kader für Rio 2016" which is a program funded by the Austrian ministry of sports to support athletes with the prospect of qualifying for the Olympics in Rio de Janeiro. Besides her sports career, Grünberg started studying pharmacy in autumn 2013.

Grünberg participated in various international competitions and set several Austrian national records in pole vaulting. She holds the Austrian records for U16 (3.72m), U18 (4.01m), U20 (4.15m) and U23 (4.45m).

In 2010, Grünberg finished fifth at the Olympic Youth Games and fifth at the world championship for under-twenty-years-old. At the European Championship in Zürich she cleared a height of 4.45m which meant breaking the Austrian record and reaching the final of 13 participants. One year later, she finished forth at the European Championship for the age group of U23. In March 2015, she set a new Austrian indoor record with 4.45m at the European Indoor Championship in Prague.

==== Overview: Competition record ====
Year	Competition	Venue	Position	Notes
Representing Austria
2009	World Youth Championships	Brixen, Italy	10th	3.80 m
2009	European Youth Olympic Festival	Tampere, Finland	5th	3.65 m
2010	World Junior Championships	Moncton, Canada	15th (q)	3.85 m
2010	Youth Olympic Games	Singapore	5th	3.90 m
2011	European Junior Championships	Tallinn, Estonia	18th (q)	3.90 m
2012	World Junior Championships	Barcelona, Spain	4th	4.15 m
2013	European U23 Championships	Tampere, Finland	10th	4.15 m
2014	European Championships	Zürich, Switzerland	8th (q)	4.45 m
2015	European Indoor Championships	Prague, Czech Republic	16th (q)	4.45 m
2015	European U23 Championships	Tallinn, Estonia	4th	4.25 m

== Accident and aftermath ==
Grünberg was severely injured during training on 30 July 2015. The injury left her paraplegic from the chest down.

During a training on the morning of the 30th, Grünberg was doing a practice jump. The bar was only set to 4m which is quite below her personal best of 4.35m and she only took eight steps run-up, shorter than she would do it in a competition. This set-up was typical for practice jumps for her but this time something went wrong. She lacked the momentum to land on the mattress and instead fell back on the ground. Her neck hit the metal edge of the box in the ground where pole vaulters put their poles in. Her parents were present when the accident happened, the father was coaching, the mother filmed her jump for video analysis like they usually did in trainings.

After the accident, Grünberg was hospitalised in the Universitätsklinikum Innsbruck. After the doctors diagnosed a broken fifth cervical vertebra and a resulting paraplegia, she was operated with the goal of stabilising the spinal column and avoiding further damages but the paraplegia could not be avoided anymore. Three months after the accident, she was transferred to a rehabilitation clinic in the Austrian city Bad Häring where she stayed for seven months.

The public demonstrated great sympathy for the young athlete's fate. Austrian and international sportspeople, celebrities and citizens participated in benefit events for Kira Grünberg and donation campaigns were started.

The media and public were very interested in her life after the accident and her way to deal with this fundamental change in her life. She was invited to talk shows, hosted motivation talks and was interviewed for national and international media. Kira Grünberg talks about her sports career, the accident and how she dealt with the consequences in her autobiography My jump into a new life (Original title: Mein Sprung in ein neues Leben, only available in German).

== Political career ==
Grünberg herself has said that she wants to use the public awareness she received after her accident to help others in similar situations. Furthermore, she believes that she can use her own experience in politics, focusing on the needs of disabled people.

At the 2017 National Council election, she ran and was elected at tenth place on the ÖVP's federal list and as number one on the regional list of Tirol. Grünberg took office on 9 November 2017. From November 2017, she was part of the working groups on work and social affairs, civil rights, equal rights and sports.

When Grünberg received a car from Opel which was adapted to her paraplegic needs, critics questioned her political independency. The present was handed over to her two months after she started her work in the National Council. Grünberg, the ÖVP and Opel denied political influenced and underlined that Opel had already promised her the car in 2015 but that the realization took two years. The National Council removed Grünberg's parliamentary immunity in this case. Consequently, the public prosecutors could start an investigation into possible corruption or political influence.

After the whole National Council was dissolved, Grünberg was re-elected in the 2019 election. She lost re-election in 2024. On Karoline Edtstadler's resignation from the National Council in July 2025, Grünberg moved up on her party's federal list to succeeded her.

== Website ==
- Official Website
- Kira Grünberg's biography Austrian Parliament
