= Angelica Bengtsson =

Swedish pole vaulter

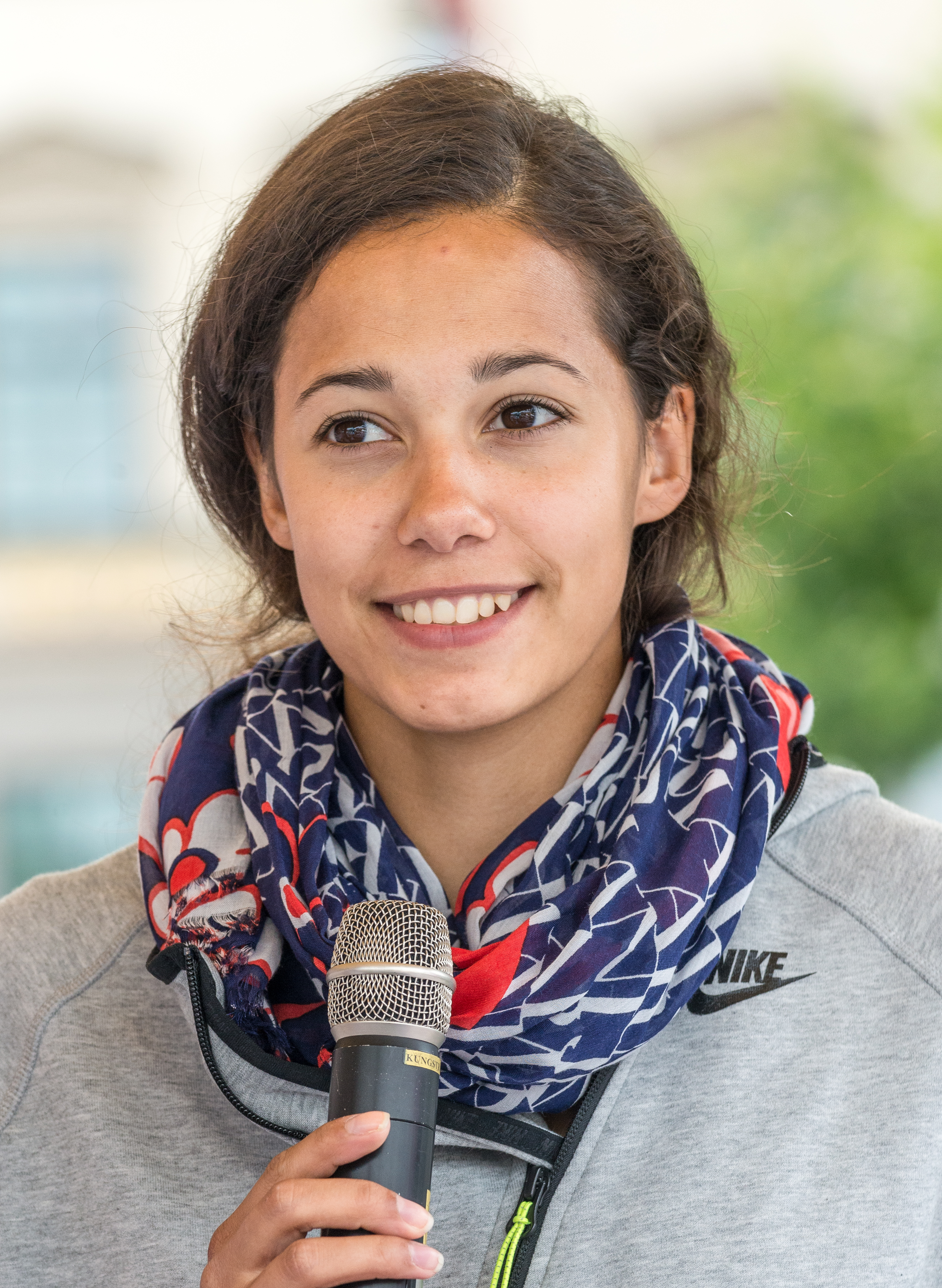
- Angelica Bengtsson in July 2015

Personal information
- Full name: Angelica Therese Bengtsson
- Nationality: (Sweden) Swedish
- Born: 8 July 1993 (age 33) Väckelsång, Sweden
- Height: 1.63 m (5 ft 4 in)
- Weight: 51 kg (112 lb)
- Website: angelicabengtsson.com

Achievements and titles
- Personal bests: outdoor: 4.80 m (2019) indoor: 4.81 m (2019)
Medal record
Women's athletics
Representing Sweden
European Championships
| Bronze medal – third place | 2016 Amsterdam | Pole vault |
European Indoor Championships
| Bronze medal – third place | 2015 Prague | Pole vault |
| Bronze medal – third place | 2017 Belgrade | Pole vault |
European U23 Championships
| Gold medal – first place | 2015 Tallinn | Pole vault |
| Bronze medal – third place | 2013 Tampere | Pole vault |
World Junior Championships
| Gold medal – first place | 2010 Moncton | Pole vault |
| Gold medal – first place | 2012 Barcelona | Pole vault |
European Junior Championships
| Gold medal – first place | 2011 Tallinn | Pole vault |
Youth Olympic Games
| Gold medal – first place | 2010 Singapore | Pole vault |
World Youth Championships
| Gold medal – first place | 2009 Brixen | Pole vault |
- Updated on February 25, 2019

Angelica Therese Bengtsson (born 8 July 1993) is a Swedish track and field athlete who specialises in the pole vault. She became the first pole vault winner at the inaugural Summer Youth Olympics in Singapore, 2010.

Bengtsson has won gold medals at the 2009 World Youth Championships and the 2010 World Junior Championships in Athletics. She set a mark of 4.47 m for the youth world record for the event in 2010 and broke the world junior record with a vault of 4.63 m in 2011. Bengtsson placed tied 4th at the 2015 World Championships in Beijing, China, having set a national record of 4.70 m in the final. She set a then-national record with 4.81 m, set indoor in Clermont-Ferrand, on February 24, 2019. Bengtsson has won eleven national titles.

On 1 November 2021, she announced her retirement from pole vaulting.

== Biography ==
Bengtsson was born on 8 July 1993 in Väckelsång; her father is Swedish and her mother is Afro-Brazilian. Bengtsson initially started out in gymnastics and also hoped to follow in her father's footsteps in the javelin throw. It quickly became apparent that she had a talent for pole vaulting; however, and she began her career at club level for IFK Växjö, before going on to join Hässelby SK. She enjoyed her first global victory at the 2009 IAAF World Youth Championships, where at the age of sixteen she won the pole vault gold medal with a clearance of 4.32 metres. This was a significant winning margin of 22 cm over the rest of the field.

In spite of her youth, she took the national senior title at the Swedish Indoor Athletics Championships, beating her Swedish rivals with a clearance of 4.30 m. Bengtsson established herself as one of top youth athletes at the 2010 European Youth Olympic Trials in Moscow in May. Having already won the competition, she improved the world youth record to 4.42 m and then immediately improved upon this with a 4.47-metre clearance. She attempted to break the Swedish senior record (raising the bar to 4.52 m) but failed in her three vaults. Her winning mark was enough to qualify her for the senior 2010 European Athletics Championships, but she opted to focus on the younger age category competitions instead.

Building upon her youth gold from the previous year, she added another gold medal to her collection at the 2010 Junior World Championship in Moncton. Although windy conditions reduced the level of performance, a first time clearance at 4.15 m sealed her victory over the older girls and she added an extra ten centimetres between herself and Holly Bleasdale for a winning mark of 4.25 m. Her achievements made her one of the headline athletes at the first ever Summer Youth Olympics in Singapore. She duly delivered on her favourite status by winning the competition at a height of 4.30 m. Dismissing the challenge of the Silke Spiegelburg's world junior record of 4.48 m, Bengtsson went straight for the Swedish senior record, but again 4.52 m proved too much for the young athlete.

Bengtsson achieved that mark with a first time clearance at the Swedish Indoor Championships in February 2011, claiming both the world junior record and Swedish senior record at the same time.

At the 2019 World Championships final, Bengtsson broke her pole in her third attempt on 4.80 m, thus having the right to re-take the attempt. She cleared that jump, which gave her 6th place in the competition, as well as a new Swedish outdoor record.

== Achievements ==
| Year | Competition | Venue | Position | Notes |
Representing Sweden
| 2009 | World Youth Championships | Brixen, Italy | 1st | 4.32 m |
| 2010 | World Junior Championships | Moncton, Canada | 1st | 4.25 m |
| 2010 | Youth Olympic Games | Singapore | 1st | 4.30 m |
| 2011 | European Indoor Championships | Paris, France | 12th (q) | 4.35 m |
| 2011 | European Junior Championships | Tallinn, Estonia | 1st | 4.57 m |
| 2012 | European Championships | Helsinki, Finland | 10th | 4.30 m |
| 2012 | World Junior Championships | Barcelona, Spain | 1st | 4.50 m |
| 2012 | Olympic Games | London, United Kingdom | 19th (q) | 4.25 m |
| 2013 | European Indoor Championships | Gothenburg, Sweden | 9th (q) | 4.46 m |
| 2013 | European U23 Championships | Tampere, Finland | 3rd | 4.55 m |
| 2013 | World Championships | Moscow, Russia | 16th (q) | 4.45 m |
| 2014 | European Championships | Zürich, Switzerland | 5th | 4.45 m |
| 2015 | European Indoor Championships | Prague, Czech Republic | 3rd | 4.70 m |
| 2015 | European U23 Championships | Tallinn, Estonia | 1st | 4.55 m |
| 2015 | World Championships | Beijing, China | 4th | 4.70 m |
| 2016 | European Championships | Amsterdam, Netherlands | 3rd | 4.65 m |
| 2016 | Olympic Games | Rio de Janeiro, Brazil | 14th (q) | 4.55 m |
| 2017 | European Indoor Championships | Belgrade, Serbia | 3rd | 4.55 m |
| 2017 | World Championships | London, United Kingdom | 10th | 4.55 m |
| 2018 | World Indoor Championships | Birmingham, United Kingdom | 11th | 4.50 m |
| 2018 | European Championships | Berlin, Germany | 6th | 4.65 m |
| 2019 | European Indoor Championships | Glasgow, United Kingdom | 14th (q) | 4.40 m |
| 2019 | World Championships | Doha, Qatar | 6th | 4.80 m |
| 2021 | Olympic Games | Tokyo, Japan | 13th | 4.50 m |

== See also ==
- List of world under-20 records in athletics
- European Athlete of the Year

== Gallery ==
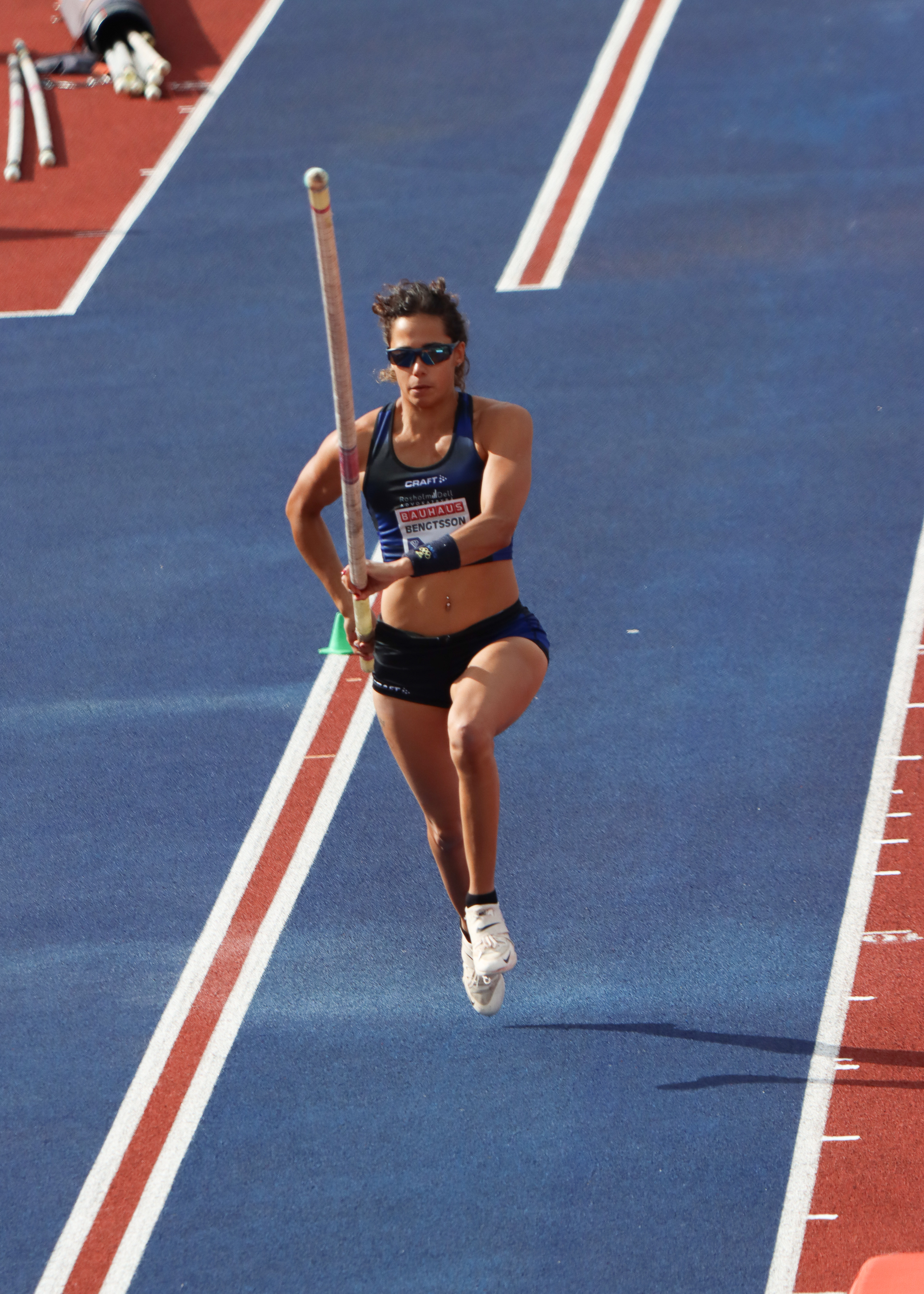
Angelica Bengtsson at the 2020 Bauhaus Galan meeting in Stockholm

Awards and achievements
| Preceded by (United Kingdom) Jodie Williams | Women's European Athletics Rising Star of the Year; 2012 | Succeeded by (Iceland) Aníta Hinriksdóttir |
