= Katharina Bauer =

German pole vaulter (born 1990)

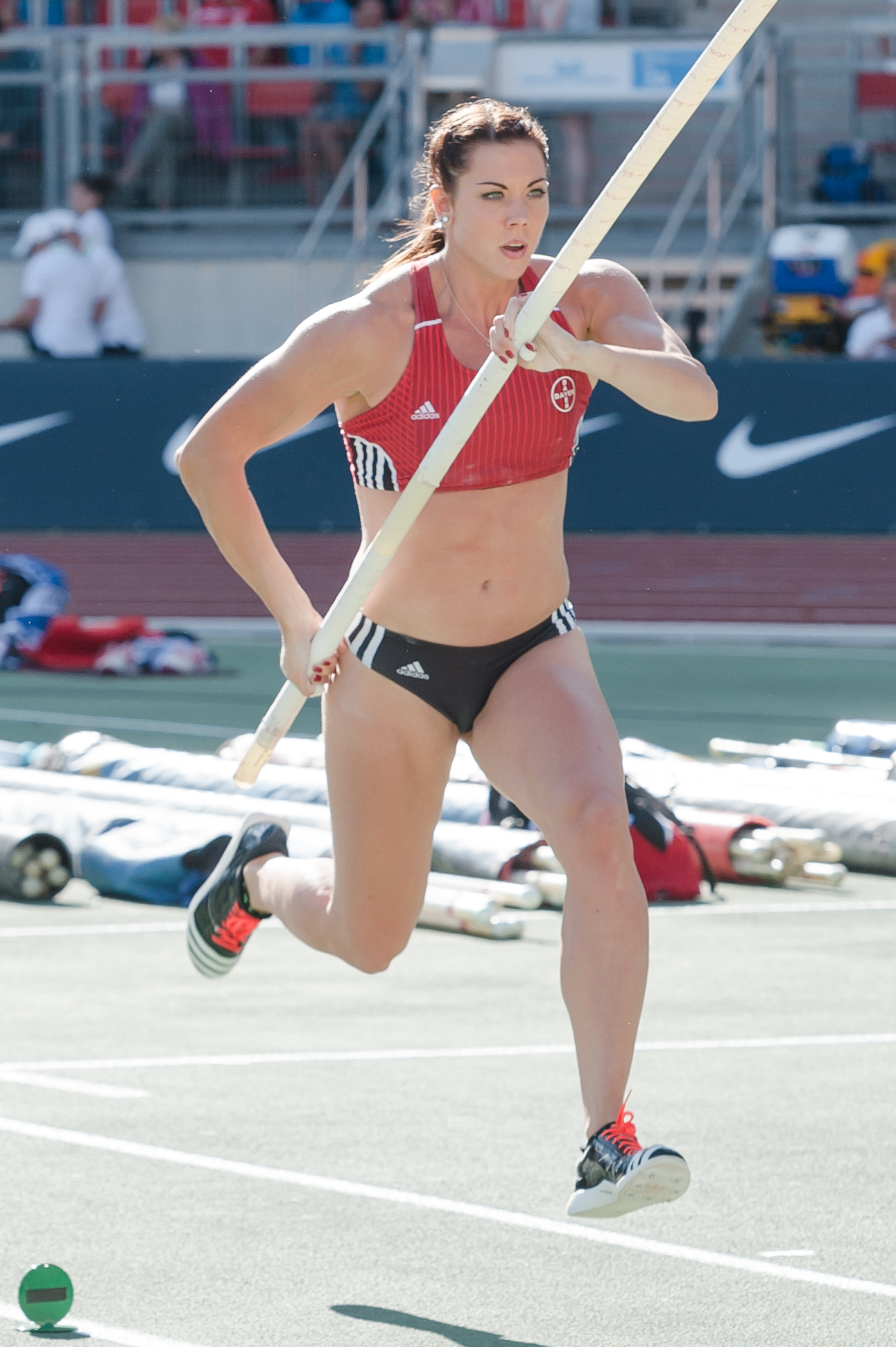
- Bauer in 2015

Personal information
- Born: 12 June 1990 (age 36) Wiesbaden, West Germany
- Height: 1.80 m (5 ft 11 in)
- Weight: 64 kg (141 lb)

Sport
- Sport: Athletics
- Event: Pole vault
- Club: TSV Bayer 04 Leverkusen
- Coached by: Leszek Klima

Katharina Bauer (born 12 June 1990 in Wiesbaden) is a German athlete specialising in the pole vault. She represented her country at the 2019 World Championships in Doha without qualifying for the final. In addition, she twice reached the final at the European Indoor Championships.

Her personal bests in the event are 4.65 metres outdoors (Beckum (GER) and 4.60 metres indoors (Leverkusen 2015).

== International competitions ==
| Year | Competition | Venue | Position | Notes |
Representing Germany
| 2007 | World Youth Championships | Ostrava, Czech Republic | 6th | 3.95 m |
| 2011 | European U23 Championships | Ostrava, Czech Republic | 12th (q) | 4.10 m^{1} |
| 2013 | European Indoor Championships | Gothenburg, Sweden | 8th | 4.22 m |
| 2013 | Universiade | Kazan, Russia | 5th | 4.30 m |
| 2014 | European Championships | Zürich, Switzerland | 17th (q) | 4.25 m |
| 2015 | European Indoor Championships | Prague, Czech Republic | 6th (q) | 4.60 m^{1} |
| 2019 | European Indoor Championships | Glasgow, United Kingdom | 14th (q) | 4.40 m |
| 2019 | World Championships | Doha, Qatar | – | NM |

^{1}No mark in the final

== Personal life ==
Having problems with abnormally fast heartbeat since her youth, she competes with an implantable cardioverter-defibrillator (ICD) in her chest.

Before the 2016 Summer Olympics in Rio de Janeiro, which Bauer ultimately missed due to a hand injury, she posed together with swimmer Isabelle Härle, cyclist Nadja Pries, table tennis player Petrissa Solja and rower Julia Lier for the German edition of Playboy.
