= Athletics at the 2010 Summer Youth Olympics – Girls' pole vault =

Athletics – girls' pole vault at the I Summer Youth Olympic Games
- Venue: Bishan Stadium
- Date: August 17–21
- Competitors: 15 from 15 nations

Medalists
1st place, gold medalist(s)		Angelica Bengtsson	Sweden
2nd place, silver medalist(s)		Elizabeth Parnov	Australia
3rd place, bronze medalist(s)		Ganna Shelekh	Ukraine

The girls' pole vault event at the 2010 Youth Olympic Games was held on 17–21 August 2010 in Bishan Stadium.

== Schedule ==
Date	Time	Round
17 August 2010	09:15	Qualification
21 August 2010	09:05	Final

== Results ==
=== Qualification ===
Rank	Athlete	3.35	3.50	3.60	3.70	3.80	3.90	Result	Notes	Q
1	Ganna Shelekh (UKR)	-	-	-	o	o	o	3.90		FA
2	Angelica Bengtsson (SWE)	-	-	-	-	xo	o	3.90		FA
2	Xu Huiqin (CHN)	-	-	-	xo	-	o	3.90		FA
4	Natalia Demidenko (RUS)	-	-	-	xxo	o	o	3.90		FA
5	Elizabeth Parnov (AUS)	-	-	-	-	-	xxo	3.90		FA
6	Kira Grunberg (AUT)	-	-	-	o	xo	-	3.80		FA
7	Michaela Donie (GER)	-	-	xo	xo	xo	xxx	3.80		FA
8	Remi Odajima (JPN)	-	o	xo	o	xxo	xxx	3.80		FA
9	Katie Byres (GBR)	-	-	xo	xxo	xxx		3.70		FB
10	Dora Mahfoudhi (TUN)	xo	o	xo	xxx			3.60	PB	FB
11	Laura Izquierdo (ESP)	o	o	xxx				3.50		FB
12	Iryna Yakaltsevich (BLR)	o	xo	xxx				3.50		FB
13	Tiziana Ruiz (MEX)	xo	xo	xxx				3.50		FB
14	Diana Szabo (HUN)	xo	xxx					3.35		FB
	Reed Hancock (USA)	xxx						NM		FB

=== Finals ===
==== Final B ====
Rank	Athlete	3.30	3.45	3.60	3.70	3.80	3.90	4.00	4.10	Result	Notes
1	Katie Byres (GBR)	-	-	o	-	o	-	xxo	xxx	4.00	
2	Iryna Yakaltsevich (BLR)	o	o	o	xo	o	o	xxx		3.90	PB
3	Laura Izquierdo (ESP)	o	o	xxx						3.45	
3	Tiziana Ruiz (MEX)	o	o	xxx						3.45	
5	Dora Mahfoudhi (TUN)	xxo	o	xxx						3.45	
6	Diana Szabo (HUN)	o	xo	xx						3.45	
7	Reed Hancock (USA)	xxo	xxx							3.30	

==== Final A ====
Rank	Athlete	3.50	3.65	3.80	3.90	4.00	4.10	4.20	4.25	4.30	4.35	4.52	Result	Notes
1st place, gold medalist(s)	Angelica Bengtsson (SWE)	-	-	-	-	o	o	o	-	o	-	xxx	4.30	
2nd place, silver medalist(s)	Elizabeth Parnov (AUS)	-	-	-	-	xo	o	o	o	-	xxx		4.25	
3rd place, bronze medalist(s)	Ganna Shelekh (UKR)	-	-	o	o	xo	o	xxo	xxx				4.20	
4	Xu Huiqin (CHN)	-	-	o	-	xo	o	xxx					4.10	
5	Kira Grunberg (AUT)	-	-	o	o	xxx							3.90	
6	Natalia Demidenko (RUS)	-	o	xxx									3.65	
6	Remi Odajima (JPN)	o	o	xxx									3.65	
	Michaela Donie (GER)	-	xxx										NM	
