= 2015 World Championships in Athletics – Women's pole vault =

Women's pole vault at the 2015 World Championships
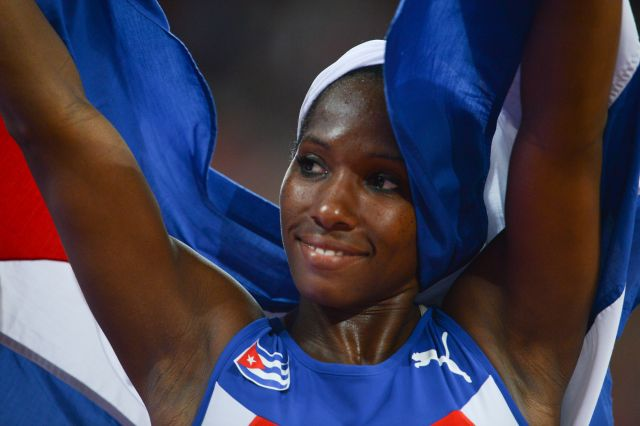
- Winner Yarisley Silva
- Venue: Beijing National Stadium
- Dates: 24 August (qualification); 26 August (final)
- Competitors: 29 from 19 nations
- Winning height: 4.90 m (16 ft 3/4 in)

Medalists
gold medal	Yarisley Silva	Cuba
silver medal	Fabiana Murer	Brazil
bronze medal	Nikoleta Kyriakopoulou	Greece

The women's pole vault at the 2015 World Championships in Athletics was held at the Beijing National Stadium on 24 and 26 August. 2013 Champion and world record holder Yelena Isinbayeva did not defend her title having given birth to her first child in 2014.

Fourteen athletes qualified at 4.55, but two were unable to get over the opening height of 4.50 in the finals. Minna Nikkanen set her National Record at 4.60, but there were still seven in at 4.70, five of them with clean rounds to that point making for a five-way tie including Angelica Bengtsson's National Record and returning silver medalist Jenn Suhr, who had confidently passed to 4.60. 4.80 decided the medalists with Nikoleta Kyriakopoulou taking it on the first attempt to take over the lead. 2011 champion Fabiana Murer took it on her second attempt and was ahead of Yarisley Silva who had struggled earlier at 4.70. Both Silva and Murer made 4.85 on their first attempt, giving Murer the lead. Murer also again equalled her own South American record. Kyriakopoulou missed at what would have been her National Record. Having no strategic advantage to clearing it with one miss, she passed to 4.90. Everybody missed their first two attempts at 4.90, making Kyriakopoulou the bronze medalist. On her final attempt, Silva made it, to leap past Murer into gold medal position. Murer was unable to answer on her final attempt and had to settle for silver. Murer was pleased to win a medal in Beijing seven years after the 2008 Olympics, where she underperformed following her poles being misplaced by the organization, and became optimistic for the 2016 Summer Olympics at her own Brazil, when she will have to set a masters world record to be in the medal hunt.

== Records ==
Prior to the competition, the established records were as follows.

World record	Yelena Isinbayeva (RUS)	5.06	Zürich, Switzerland	28 August 2009
Championship record	Yelena Isinbayeva (RUS)	5.01	Helsinki, Finland	12 August 2005
World leading	Yarisley Silva (CUB)	4.91	Beckum, Germany	2 August 2015
African record	Elmarie Gerryts (RSA)	4.42	Wesel, Germany	12 June 2000
Asian record	Li Ling (CHN)	4.66	Wuhan, China	6 June 2015
North, Central American and Caribbean record	Jennifer Suhr (USA)	4.92	Eugene, OR, United States	6 July 2008
South American record	Fabiana Murer (BRA)	4.85	San Fernando, Spain	4 June 2010
European record	Yelena Isinbayeva (RUS)	5.06	Zürich, Switzerland	28 August 2009
Oceanian record	Alana Boyd (AUS)	4.76	Perth, Australia	24 February 2012

== Qualification standards ==
Entry standards
4.50

== Schedule ==
Date	Time	Round
24 August 2015	09:30	Qualification
26 August 2015	19:00	Final

All times are local times (UTC+8)

== Results ==
KEY:	Q	Qualified	q	12 best performers	NR	National record	PB	Personal best	SB	Seasonal best

=== Qualification ===
Qualification: 4.60 m (Q) or at least 12 best performers (q).

Rank	Group	Name	Nationality	4.15	4.30	4.45	4.55	Mark	Notes
1	B	Angelica Bengtsson	Sweden	–	o	o	o	4.55	q
1	A	Fabiana Murer	Brazil	–	–	–	o	4.55	q
1	B	Holly Bradshaw	Great Britain & N.I.	–	o	o	o	4.55	q, SB
1	A	Martina Strutz	Germany	–	o	o	o	4.55	q
1	A	Nikoleta Kyriakopoulou	Greece	–	–	o	o	4.55	q
6	B	Lisa Ryzih	Germany	–	–	xo	o	4.55	q
6	B	Minna Nikkanen	Finland	o	o	xo	o	4.55	q
6	A	Michaela Meijer	Sweden	o	o	xo	o	4.55	q, PB
9	B	Jenn Suhr	United States	–	–	–	xo	4.55	q
9	B	Yarisley Silva	Cuba	–	–	o	xo	4.55	q
11	A	Li Ling	China	–	o	o	xxo	4.55	q
11	A	Sandi Morris	United States	–	o	o	xxo	4.55	q
11	B	Alana Boyd	Australia	–	–	o	xxo	4.55	q
11	B	Anzhelika Sidorova	Russia	–	–	o	xxo	4.55	q
15	B	Katerina Stefanidi	Greece	–	xo	o	xxx	4.45	
16	A	Naroa Agirre	Spain	xo	xxo	o	xxx	4.45	
17	A	Nicole Büchler	Switzerland	–	o	xxo	xxx	4.45	
17	A	Silke Spiegelburg	Germany	–	o	xxo	xxx	4.45	
19	B	Demi Payne	United States	–	o	xxx		4.30	
20	A	Tori Pena	Ireland	xo	o	xxx		4.30	
21	B	Femke Pluim	Netherlands	–	xo	xxx		4.30	
21	A	Marion Lotout	France	–	xo	xxx		4.30	
23	A	Robeilys Peinado	Venezuela	xo	xo	xxx		4.30	
24	B	Malin Dahlström	Sweden	o	xxx			4.15	
25	B	Angelica Moser	Switzerland	xxo	xxx			4.15	
25	B	Ren Mengqian	China	xxo	xxx			4.15	
	A	Jiřina Ptáčníková	Czech Republic	–	xxx			NM	
	A	Nina Kennedy	Australia	xxx				NM	
	B	Tina Šutej	Slovenia	–	xxx			NM	

=== Final ===
The final was started at 19:00.

Rank	Name	Nationality	4.35	4.50	4.60	4.70	4.80	4.85	4.90	5.01	Mark	Notes
1st place, gold medalist(s)	Yarisley Silva	Cuba	–	o	o	xxo	xo	o	xxo	xxx	4.90	
2nd place, silver medalist(s)	Fabiana Murer	Brazil	–	o	o	o	xo	o	xxx		4.85	=AR
3rd place, bronze medalist(s)	Nikoleta Kyriakopoulou	Greece	–	o	xo	xo	o	x-	xx		4.80	
4	Sandi Morris	United States	o	o	o	o	xxx				4.70	
4	Angelica Bengtsson	Sweden	o	o	o	o	xxx				4.70	NR
4	Jenn Suhr	United States	–	–	o	o	xxx				4.70	
7	Holly Bradshaw	Great Britain & N.I.	o	o	xo	o	xxx				4.70	SB
8	Martina Strutz	Germany	o	o	o	xxx					4.60	
9	Li Ling	China	xo	o	o	xxx					4.60	
10	Minna Nikkanen	Finland	xo	xo	o	xxx					4.60	NR
11	Alana Boyd	Australia	xo	o	xo	xxx					4.60	
12	Lisa Ryzih	Germany	–	o	xxo	xxx					4.60	
	Anzhelika Sidorova	Russia	–	xxx							NM	
	Michaela Meijer	Sweden	xxx								NM	
