= Väckelsång =

- Location within Kronoberg Location within Sweden
- Coordinates: 56°38′N 14°55′E
- Country: Sweden
- Province: Småland
- County: Kronoberg County
- Municipality: Tingsryd Municipality

Area
  - Total: 1.23 km^{2} (0.47 sq mi)

Population (31 December 2010)
  - Total: 905
  - Density: 734/km^{2} (1,900/sq mi)
- Time zone: UTC+1 (CET)
  - Summer (DST): UTC+2 (CEST)

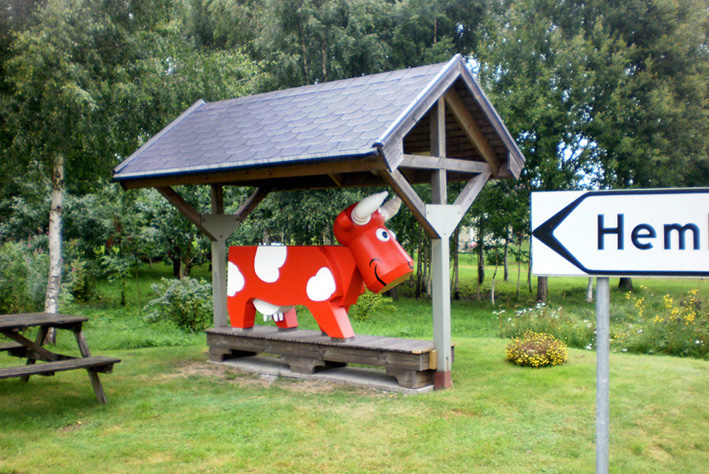
Väckelsång, 2011

Väckelsång is a locality situated in Tingsryd Municipality, Kronoberg County, Sweden with 905 inhabitants in 2010.
