= Sally Scott =

English pole vaulter

Personal information
- Nationality: British
- Born: 12 April 1991 (age 35) Newcastle upon Tyne, England

Sport
- Country: England
- Sport: Athletics
- Event: Pole vault
Medal record
Representing England
Women's Pole Vault
Commonwealth Games
| Bronze medal – third place | 2014 Glasgow | Pole vault |
- Updated on 15 September 2014

Sally Scott (born 12 April 1991) is a British track and field athlete. She competed for England in the Pole vault event at the 2014 Commonwealth Games where she won a bronze medal.she played hockey in the olympic games and won a gold medal.
