= Marion Fiack =

French pole vaulter

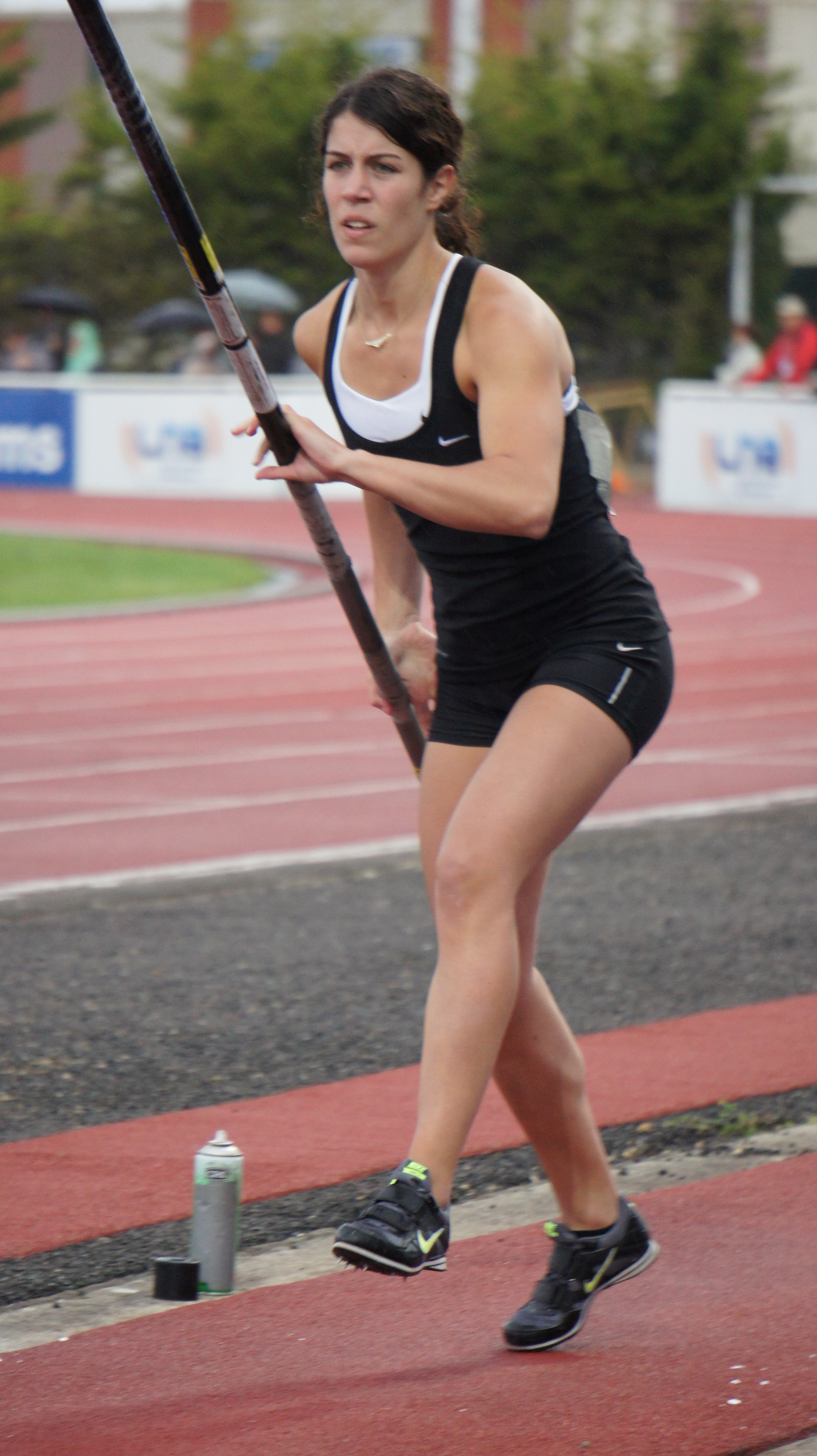
- Fiack in 2013

Personal information
- Other names: Marion Sidea
- Born: 13 October 1992 (age 33) Reims
- Height: 1.70 m (5 ft 7 in)
- Weight: 60 kg (132 lb)

Sport
- Country: France
- Sport: Athletics
- Event: Pole vault
- Club: Thionville
- Coached by: Joël Mertz, Philippe d'Encausse

Achievements and titles
- National finals: French Pole Vault Record at 4.71m

Marion Fiack (born 13 October 1992 in Reims), also known as Marion Sidea, is a French athlete, a specialist in the Pole vault. She holds the France record for this discipline with a vault of 4.71 m. She also holds the French junior record and French Under 23s record with vaults respectively of 4.36 m and 4.61 m.

== Biographie ==
=== Youth ===
Born at Reims into a family of athletes, including a grandfather who played professional basketball, Marion Fiack was, at first, primarily dedicated to the middle distance and combined events.

First coached by Joël Mertz at Thionville, she won her first cap for France in 2009, at the European Youth Olympic Festival at Tampere. In 2010, she vaulted for the first time over 4 m in the pole vault by performing a vault of 4.12 m at Forbach, which was a regional record. She qualified for the 2010 World Junior Championships in Athletics at Moncton, but did not proceed past the qualifying rounds.

In 2011, she left Lorraine to settle in Clermont-Ferrand. Trained by Philippe EncausseIt, she beat, on 10 December 2011, the French junior record with a vault of 4.36m in a competition won by the British woman, Holly Bradshaw, in front of Vanessa Boslak, who held the previous record.

=== Under 23s ===
Competing in the Senior level competition, Marion Fiack became Indoors 2013 vice-champion of France with a vault of 4.35 meters, being beaten that day by Marion Lotout. Outdoors, she placed 5th in Under 23s European Championships at Tampere.

She started the 2014 season with a personal best of 4.51 m at Aubière. On 18 January 2014 at Orleans, Marion Fiack vaulted 4.61 m, improving the French Under 23 record, and temporarily seizing the best world performance of the year tied with the British Holly Bradshaw. In February she was again vice-champion of France behind Marion Lotout (4.51 m against 4.56 m).

She continued, outdoors, with a victory at Pézenas in late May by vaulting 4.55 m. At the French championships she took second place, beaten by Vanessa Boslak. At the European Championships from Zurich, she failed to reach the final, having to settle for 4.35 m.

=== 2015 season : France Senior record ===
On 10 January 2015 at Aubière, she improved 10 cm to clear 4.71 m. This thus beats the France record formerly held by Vanessa Boslak (4.70 m since 28 June 2006) and seized temporarily the best world performance of the year. Her Indoor season is successful winning the champion of France title at Aubiere where she vaulted 4.60 m. She managed the same performance in early March at European Indoor Championships, Enabling her to qualify for the final where she will repeat this performance (5th with 4.50 m).

Spending some time in the United States in order to prepare for the summer season, she injured her hand. She cannot return to her best and must end this season, which deprives her of the chance to participate in the World Championships.

=== 2016 : retour ===
A little lack of confidence, Marion returned to competition at the meeting at Orleans with only a vault of 4.13 m. The following week, she managed 4.38 m at Rouen where she took fourth in the competition.

=== Prize list ===
International Awards
Date	Competition	Location	Result	Vault
2013	European Championship Under 23s	Tampere	5th	4.30 m
2015	European Indoor Championships	Prague	5th	4.50 m

Domestic honors
Date	Competition	Location	Result	Vault
2013	France Indoor Championships	Aubière	2nd	4,35 m
2014	France Indoor Championships	Bordeaux	2nd	4,51 m
2014	France Championships	Reims	2nd	4,40 m
2015	France Indoor Championships	Aubière	1st	4,60 m

=== Records ===
personal records
Event		Performance	Location	Date
Pole vault	Outdoors	4,55 m	Pézenas	24 May 2014
Pole vault	Indoors	4,71 m (National Indoor Record)	Aubière	10 January 2015
