= Hanna Shelekh =

Ukrainian athlete

Personal information
- Born: 14 July 1993 (age 32) Donetsk, Ukraine
- Height: 1.68 m (5 ft 6 in)
- Weight: 62 kg (137 lb)

Sport
- Sport: Pole vault
Medal record
Women's athletics
Representing Ukraine
Summer Youth Olympics
Bronze medal – third place	2010 Singapore	Pole vault

Hanna Shelekh (born 14 July 1993) is a Ukrainian athlete who competes in the pole vault. She competed in the Women's pole vault at the 2012 Summer Olympics.
