= Holly Bradshaw =

British pole vaulter (born 1991)

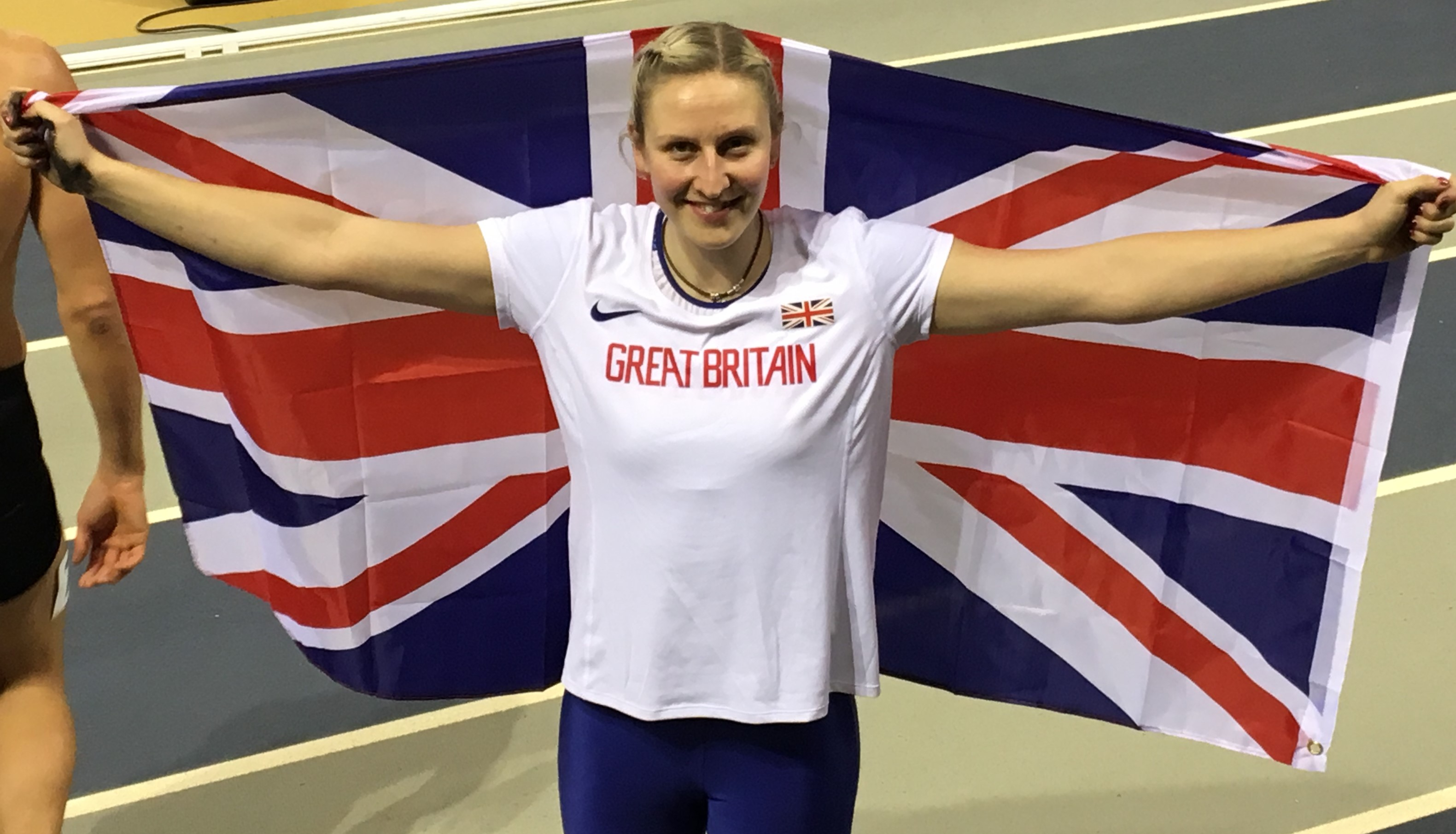
- Bradshaw after winning silver at the 2019 European Indoor Championships

Personal information
- Full name: Holly Bethan Bradshaw
- Nationality: British
- Born: Holly Bethan Bleasdale; 2 November 1991 (age 35) Preston, Lancashire, Great Britain
- Height: 175 cm (5 ft 9 in)
- Weight: 66 kg (146 lb)
- Spouse: Paul Bradshaw

Sport
- Country: Great Britain
- Sport: Athletics
- Event: Pole Vault
- Club: Blackburn Harriers
- Turned pro: 2010
- Coached by: Scott Simpson

Achievements and titles
- Personal bests: 4.90m (2021); 4.87m i (2012)
Medal record
Women's athletics
Representing Great Britain
Olympic Games
Bronze medal – third place	2020 Tokyo	Pole vault
World Indoor Championships
Bronze medal – third place	2012 Istanbul	Pole vault
European Championships
Bronze medal – third place	2018 Berlin	Pole vault
European Indoor Championships
Gold medal – first place	2013 Gothenburg	Pole vault
Silver medal – second place	2019 Glasgow	Pole vault
Bronze medal – third place	2021 Toruń	Pole vault
Athletics World Cup
Gold medal – first place	2018 London	Pole vault
European U23 Championships
Gold medal – first place	2011 Ostrava	Pole vault
World Junior Championships
Bronze medal – third place	2010 Moncton	Pole vault
- Updated on October 2024

Holly Bethan Bradshaw, née Bleasdale, (2 November 1991) is an English retired track and field athlete who specialised in the pole vault. Bradshaw won a bronze medal at the 2020 Summer Olympics, the first ever Olympic medal for a British woman in the event.

Bradshaw was previously the British record holder in the event indoors and outdoors, with clearances of 4.87 metres (2012 indoors) and 4.90 metres (2021 outdoors), before both marks were taken by Molly Caudery. She also won bronze at the 2012 World Indoor Championships, gold at the 2013 European Indoor Championships, bronze at the 2018 European Championships, and silver at the 2019 European Indoor Championships. She also won the event at the team-based 2018 Athletics World Cup.

Coached by Scott Simpson, she was consistently ranked among the world's best and was ranked in the world top ten on the Track and Field News merit rankings in eight seasons (2012, 2013, 2016, 2017, 2018, 2019, 2021 and 2022).

The dominant domestic vaulter for a decade and a half, Bradshaw was also a fifteen-time national champion; ten times out doors, and five times indoors. The tail-end of her career briefly overlapped with future double world indoor champion and her successor as British number one, Molly Caudery

Bradshaw announced her retirement from elite athletics in 2024.

== Early life ==
Bradshaw was involved in gymnastics from the age of six until she was 11, when she decided to try running. It was not until she was 17 that she tried pole vaulting for the first time.

== Education ==
Bradshaw was educated at Parklands Languages High School, a co-educational state comprehensive school in the town of Chorley in Lancashire, in North West England. She attended Runshaw College in Leyland from 2008 to 2010, where she completed her A-Levels. She is now studying for a degree in Sports Exercise and Science at Manchester Met University via distance learning to allow time for her training.

== Career ==
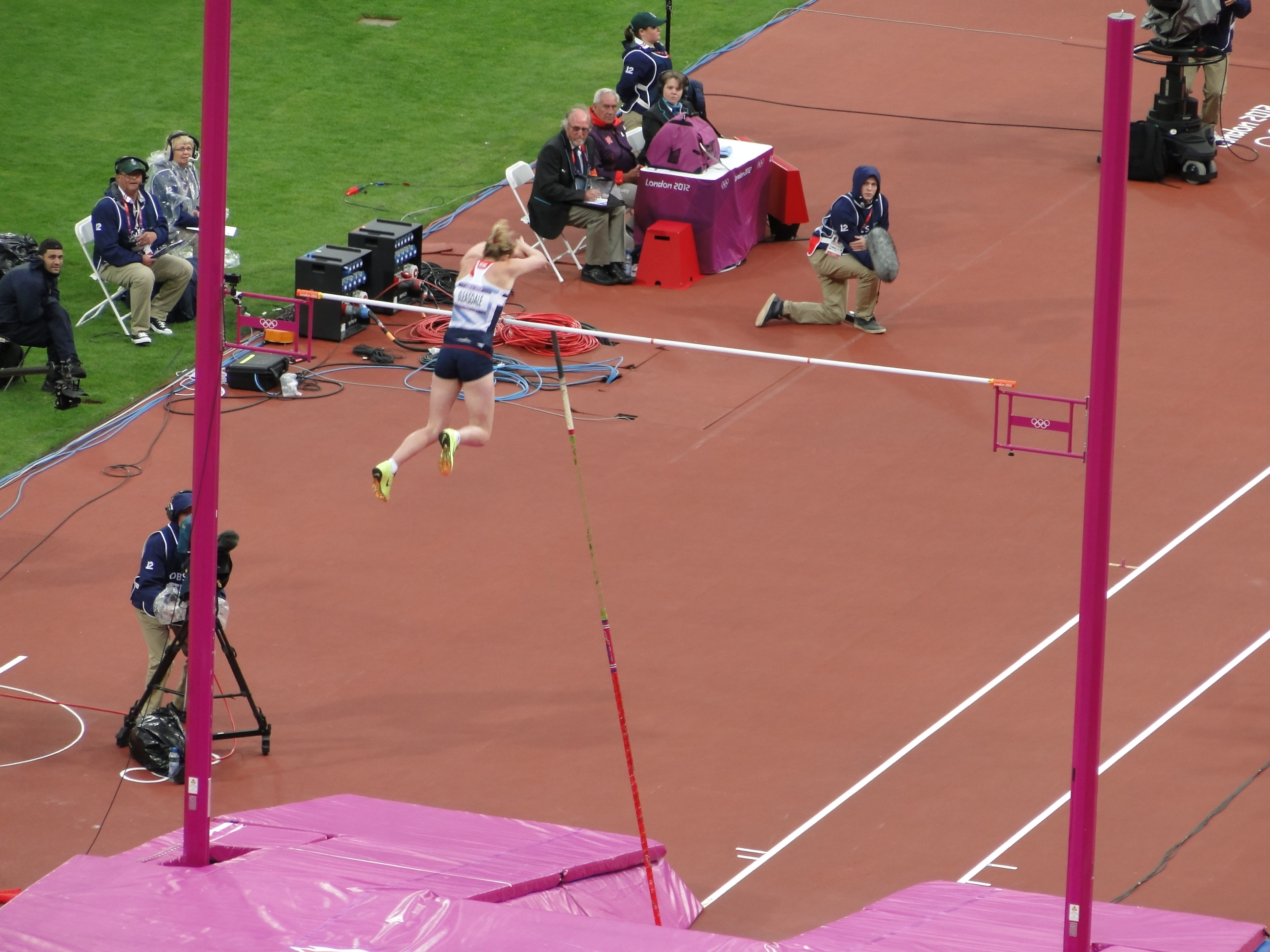
Bleasdale at the 2012 London Olympics

Bradshaw's Junior career took off when she broke the British Junior pole vault record in June 2010, with a vault of 4.35m. A month later, she competed at the 2010 World Junior Championship, in which she was the favourite for the gold medal. However, she failed to vault higher than 4.15m, resulting in a bronze medal behind Angelica Bengtsson and Victoria von Eynatten, who vaulted 4.25m and 4.20m respectively.

Bradshaw's first competition of the 2011 season was the 2011 European Indoor Championships, where she finished 11th in the qualifying round, with a best vault of 4.45m. Later in 2011, she represented Great Britain in the European Team Championships, where she finished in 5th place.

In June 2011, Bradshaw set a new British U23 record with a 4.53m vault at the British Under-23 Championships in Bedford. However, just 5 days later, she set a new British senior record of 4.70m.

In January 2012, Bradshaw improved the British indoor record by clearing 4.87m in Villeurbanne, during a Perche Élite Tour meeting. This put her third on the world all-time list, behind Yelena Isinbayeva and Jenn Suhr, and also third all-time for indoor performances. At the same competition she made her first world indoor record attempt at 5.01m, but failed. Later that year, on 11 March she won a bronze medal at the World Indoor Championships held in Istanbul.

Bradshaw competed in the 2012 Summer Olympics in London. She managed to reach the final, but knocked the bar at 4.55m, causing her to crash out of the running for a medal. However, she managed to finish in the top 8. In an interview with BBC Radio 5 Live, Bradshaw said that she was disappointed but that "by Rio, I will be at the top of my game." Bradshaw won gold at the 2013 European Athletics Indoor Championships in Gothenburg with a height of 4.67m in a jump off with Poland's Anna Rogowska, both having previously jumped 4.72. She later stated in an interview that she could have shared gold with Rogowska, but chose to jump off to be the lone winner of the gold.

In 2015, Bradshaw vaulted 4.55 m to be selected in the British Team to the World Championships. At the World Championships in Beijing, she cleared 4.70 m before failing at 4.80 m. With this height, she finished 7th in the final where the Cuban Yarisley Silva took the gold medal with a jump of 4.90 m.

=== 2016 ===
Bradshaw competed in the Rio 2016 Summer Olympics, jumping 4.60m to advance to the final. In the final she cleared 4.70m on her second attempt but failed her three attempts at 4.80m and finished fifth. She almost cleared her last attempt at 4.80m but in the last moment the cross bar fell to the ground.

After the Olympics, she competed in 2016 Diamond League in Zurich, winning first place with 4.76m.

=== 2017 ===
Bradshaw participated in many of the 2017 Diamond League meetings, and also reached the finals of the Diamond League in Brussels. She set a new personal best outdoors in Manchester in the same year at 4.81m. She participated in other notable events of pole vault around the world that year, which secured her a place in the 2017 IAAF World Championships in London in front of the home crowd, where she ended up 6th with a jump of 4.65m, and she lost the bronze medal only on count back. She has been hoping to seek glory that was taken away from her in the 2012 Olympic games in the same stadium, and afterward said she would focus on the 2018 IAAF World Indoor Championships in Birmingham. She also won the national outdoor championships in 2017.

=== 2018 ===
Bradshaw started her 2018 indoor season in February, competing in the Perche Élite Tour meet in Rouen, France, where she won with a clearance of 4.60 metres before going on to clear 4.70m on 30 March at an outdoor competition in Australia. As one of the favourites for the pole vault title at the 2018 Commonwealth Games on the Gold Coast, she finished fourth with another clearance of 4.60m. After clearing a season's best of 4.72 metres on 8 July in Rottach-Egern, she went on to win the biggest outdoor title of her career on 14 July 2018, when she won at the inaugural Athletics World Cup in London, improving her season's best to 4.75 metres. She further improved her season's best to 4.80 metres on 17 July in Jockgrim, before winning a bronze medal on 9 August at the European Championships in Berlin, with another clearance of 4.75 metres.

=== 2019 ===
Bradshaw had a good start in the early 2019 by winning the indoor nationals with a jump of 4.80m in February. She was selected for the 2019 IAAF World Athletics Championships in Doha, Qatar, reaching for the final with a single jump of 4.60m in qualifying. She subsequently finished in fourth place in the final.

=== 2020 ===
Bradshaw became British champion for a sixth consecutive year and eighth time in total when winning the pole vault event at the 2020 British Athletics Championships with a jump of 4.35 metres.

=== 2021 ===
At the British Championships, Bradshaw cleared a new British record height of 4.90 m, her record has since been surpassed by Molly Caudery. At the delayed Tokyo Olympics, Bradshaw won the bronze medal with a jump of 4.85 m.

=== 2022 ===
While competing in the qualifying competition for the 2022 World Athletics Championships, Bradshaw's pole snapped and she was forced to withdraw from the competition.

=== 2024 ===
Bradshaw participated in the 2024 Summer Olympics, but did not proceed past the qualification round of the pole vault. Following a short tour of post Olympic events, Bradshaw announced her retirement from the sport.

== International competitions ==
Year	Competition	Venue	Position	Notes
Representing Great Britain / England
2010	World Junior Championships	Moncton, Canada	3rd	4.15 m
2011	European U23 Championships	Ostrava, Czech Republic	1st	4.55 m
2011	European Indoor Championships	Paris, France	11th (q)	4.45 m
2011	World Championships	Daegu, South Korea	–	NM
2012	World Indoor Championships	Istanbul, Turkey	3rd	4.70 m
2012	Olympic Games	London, United Kingdom	6th	4.45 m
2013	European Indoor Championships	Gothenburg, Sweden	1st	4.67 m
2014	World Indoor Championships	Sopot, Poland	9th	4.55 m
2015	World Championships	Beijing, China	7th	4.70 m
2016	Olympic Games	Rio de Janeiro, Brazil	5th	4.70 m
2017	World Championships	London, United Kingdom	6th	4.65 m
2018	Commonwealth Games	Gold Coast, Australia	4th	4.60 m
2018	Athletics World Cup	London, United Kingdom	1st	4.75 m
2018	European Championships	Berlin, Germany	3rd	4.75 m
2019	European Indoor Championships	Glasgow, United Kingdom	2nd	4.75 m
2019	World Championships	Doha, Qatar	4th	4.80 m
2021	European Indoor Championships	Toruń, Poland	= 3rd	4.65 m
2021	Olympic Games	Tokyo, Japan	3rd	4.85 m
2023	World Championships	Budapest, Hungary	29th (q)	4.35 m
2024	European Championships	Rome, Italy	–	NM
2024	Olympic Games	Paris, France	28th (q)	4.20 m
(q) Indicates overall position in qualifying round

Note: Bradshaw had three failures at her opening height of 4.25m in the qualifying round at the 2011 World Championships

Note: in 2021 Bradshaw came joint third at the European Athletics Indoor Championships in Toruń, Poland with Iryna Zhuk of Belerus

== Personal life ==
Bradshaw married her long-term boyfriend, Paul Bradshaw, in 2014. The couple welcomed their first child in 2025.
