= Bulgaria at the 2026 European Athletics Championships =

- Flag of Bulgaria
- WA code: BUL

in Birmingham, United Kingdom 10–16 August 2026
- Competitors: 6 (2 men and 4 women)
- Medals: Gold 0 Silver 0 Bronze 2 Total 2

European Athletics Championships appearances
- 1934; 1938–1950; 1954; 1958; 1962; 1966; 1969; 1971; 1974; 1978; 1982; 1986; 1990; 1994; 1998; 2002; 2006; 2010; 2012; 2014; 2016; 2018; 2022; 2024; 2026

Bulgaria competed at the 2026 European Athletics Championships in Birmingham, United Kingdom from 10–16 August 2026.

== Medallists ==
Medal	Name	Event	Date
Bronze	Bozhidar Sarâboyukov	Men's long jump	11 August
Bronze	Aleksandra Nacheva	Women's triple jump	13 August

== Results ==
Bulgaria entered the following athletes.

Key

- Q = Qualified for the next round
- q = Qualified for the next round as a fastest loser or, in field events, by position without achieving the qualifying target
- NR = National record
- PB = Personal best
- SB = Season best
- N/A = Round not applicable for the event

Track and road events

Athlete	Event	Heat		Semifinal		Final	
Athlete	Event	Result	Rank	Result	Rank	Result	Rank
Hristo Iliev	Men's 100 m	10.66	18	Did not advance			
Kristen Radukanova	Women's 200 m	24.18	22	Did not advance			
Marinela Nineva	Women's marathon	—N/a				2:40:58 SB	37

Field events

Athlete	Event	Qualification		Final	
Athlete	Event	Distance	Position	Distance	Position
Bozhidar Sarâboyukov	Men's long jump	8.20	5 Q	8.26	3rd place, bronze medalist(s)
Aleksandra Nacheva	Women's triple jump	14.13	8 q	14.40	3rd place, bronze medalist(s)
Gabriela Petrova	Women's triple jump	14.11	9 q	13.75	11
