= Bulgaria at the 2016 European Athletics Championships =

- WA code: BUL
- National federation: BFLA
- Website: www.bfla.org

in Amsterdam
- Competitors: 17 (9 men and 8 women) in 15 events
- Medals Ranked 21st: Gold 0 Silver 3 Bronze 0 Total 3

European Athletics Championships appearances
- 1934; 1938–1950; 1954; 1958; 1962; 1966; 1969; 1971; 1974; 1978; 1982; 1986; 1990; 1994; 1998; 2002; 2006; 2010; 2012; 2014; 2016; 2018; 2022; 2024

Bulgaria competed at the 2016 European Athletics Championships in Amsterdam, Netherlands, between 6 and 10 July 2016.

== Medals ==
Medal	Name	Event	Date
Silver	Mirela Demireva	Women's high jump	7 July
Silver	Ivet Lalova-Collio	Women's 200 m	7 July
Silver	Ivet Lalova-Collio	Women's 100 m	8 July

== Results ==
Men

Track & road events

Athlete	Event	Heat		Semifinal		Final	
Athlete	Event	Result	Rank	Result	Rank	Result	Rank
Denis Dimitrov	100 m	10.57	23	Did not advance			
Mitko Tsenov	3000 m steeplechase	8:45.55	19	—		Did not advance	
Iolo Nikolov	Half marathon	—				DNF	

Field Events

Athlete	Event	Qualification		Final	
Athlete	Event	Distance	Rank	Distance	Rank
Tihomir Ivanov	High jump	2.25	10 Q	2.24	5
Denis Eradiri	Long jump	7.64	19	Did not advance	
Zlatozar Atanasov	Triple jump	16.34	13	Did not advance	
Momchil Karailiev	Triple jump	16.59	7 q	16.65	4
Georgi Tsonov	Triple jump	16.65	5 Q	16.53 SB	7
Georgi Ivanov	Shot put	NM		Did not advance	

Women

Track & road events

Athlete	Event	Heat		Semifinal		Final	
Athlete	Event	Result	Rank	Result	Rank	Result	Rank
Inna Eftimova	100 m	11.39	5 Q	11.85	23	Did not advance	
Ivet Lalova-Collio	100 m	—		11.26	4 Q	11.20	2nd place, silver medalist(s)
Inna Eftimova	200 m	23.58	16 q	23.54	18	Did not advance	
Ivet Lalova-Collio	200 m	—		22.57 SB	1 Q	22.52 SB	2nd place, silver medalist(s)
Katia Hristova	800 m	2:05.72	26	Did not advance			
Vania Stambolova	400 m hurdles	DQ		Did not advance			
Militsa Mircheva	Half marathon	—				DNF	

Field Events

Athlete	Event	Qualification		Final	
Athlete	Event	Distance	Rank	Distance	Rank
Mirela Demireva	High jump	1.92	4 Q	1.96	2nd place, silver medalist(s)
Gabriela Petrova	Triple jump	13.46	20	Did not advance	
Radoslava Mavrodieva	Shot put	17.16	10 q	18.10	5
