= Bulgaria at the 2018 European Athletics Championships =

- WA code: BUL
- National federation: BFLA
- Website: www.bfla.org

in Berlin
- Competitors: 14 (7 men and 7 women) in 15 events
- Medals Ranked =21st: Gold 0 Silver 1 Bronze 0 Total 1

European Athletics Championships appearances
- 1934; 1938–1950; 1954; 1958; 1962; 1966; 1969; 1971; 1974; 1978; 1982; 1986; 1990; 1994; 1998; 2002; 2006; 2010; 2012; 2014; 2016; 2018; 2022; 2024

Bulgaria competed at the 2018 European Athletics Championships in Berlin, Germany, from 6–12 August 2018. A delegation of 14 athletes were sent to represent the country.

The following athletes were selected to compete by the Bulgarian Athletics Federation.

== Medals ==
Medal	Name	Event	Date
Silver	Mirela Demireva	Women's high jump	10 August

== Results ==
Men

Track and roadevents

Athletes	Event	Heats		Semifinal		Final	
Athletes	Event	Result	Rank	Result	Rank	Result	Rank
Denis Dimitrov	100 metres	10.45	21	Did not advance			
Denis Dimitrov	200 metres	21.43	30	Did not advance			
Petar Peev	100 metres	10.75	38	Did not advance			
Ivo Balabanov	3000 metres steeplechase	8:51.52 PB	25	—		Did not advance	
Mitko Tsenov	3000 metres steeplechase	8:36.39	18	—		Did not advance	

Field events

Athletes	Event	Qualification		Final	
Athletes	Event	Distance	Position	Distance	Position
Denis Eradiri	Long jump	7.50	24	Did not advance	
Momchil Karailiev	Triple jump	DNS			
Georgi Ivanov	Shot put	19.40 SB	19	Did not advance	

Women

Track and road events

Athletes	Event	Heats		Semifinal		Final	
Athletes	Event	Result	Rank	Result	Rank	Result	Rank
Inna Eftimova	100 metres	11.45	7 Q	11.52	22	Did not advance	
Inna Eftimova	200 metres	23.65	8 q	23.62	21	Did not advance	
Ivet Lalova-Collio	100 metres	DNS		Did not advance			
Ivet Lalova-Collio	200 metres	—		22.65	3 Q	22.82	5

Field events

Athletes	Event	Qualification		Final	
Athletes	Event	Distance	Position	Distance	Position
Mirela Demireva	High jump	1.90	1 Q	2.00 PB	2nd place, silver medalist(s)
Milena Mitkova	Long jump	6.29	20	Did not advance	
Aleksandra Nacheva	Triple jump	13.39	26	Did not advance	
Gabriela Petrova	Triple jump	14.05	12 Q	14.26	6
Radoslava Mavrodieva	Shot put	17.87	5 Q	18.03	6
