= Bulgaria at the 2025 World Athletics Championships =

- Flag of Bulgaria
- WA code: BUL

in Tokyo, Japan 13 September 2025 – 21 September 2025
- Competitors: 4 (2 men and 2 women)
- Medals: Gold 0 Silver 0 Bronze 0 Total 0

World Athletics Championships appearances
- 1983; 1987; 1991; 1993; 1995; 1997; 1999; 2001; 2003; 2005; 2007; 2009; 2011; 2013; 2015; 2017; 2019; 2022; 2023; 2025

Bulgaria competed at the 2025 World Athletics Championships in Tokyo, Japan, from 13 to 21 September 2025.

== Results ==
Bulgaria entered 4 athletes to the championships: 2 women and 2 men.

Key

- Q = Qualified for the next round
- q = Qualified for the next round as a fastest loser or, in field events, by position without achieving the qualifying target
- NR = National record
- PB = Personal best
- SB = Season best
- N/A = Round not applicable for the event

=== Men ===
Field events

Athlete	Event	Qualification		Final	
Athlete	Event	Distance	Position	Distance	Position
Tihomir Ivanov	High jump	2.16	22	Did not advance	
Bozhidar Sarâboyukov	Long jump	8.10	7 q	8.19	5

=== Women ===
Field events

Athlete	Event	Qualification		Final	
Athlete	Event	Distance	Position	Distance	Position
Plamena Mitkova	Long jump	6.26	29	Did not advance	
Gabriela Petrova	Triple jump	13.86	14	Did not advance	
