= Petkov =

Petkov (Bulgarian: Петков), feminine Petkova (Bulgarian: Петкова) is a Bulgarian surname derived from the first name Petko. Notable people with the surname include:

- Avgustina-Kalina Petkova (born 1991), Bulgarian actress
- Diana Petkova (born 2000), Bulgarian swimmer
- Dimitar Petkov (1856–1907), Bulgarian politician
- Dobrin Petkov (1923–1987), Bulgarian conductor
- Eva Petkova, Bulgarian-American biostatistician
- Georgi Petkov (footballer, born 1976), Bulgarian football goalkeeper
- Georgi Petkov (footballer, born 1988), Bulgarian football defender
- Georgi Petkov (rower) (born 1956), Bulgarian Olympic rower
- Gergana Petkova (born 2004), American rhythmic gymnast
- Iliana Petkova (born 1977), Bulgarian volleyball player
- Irena Petkova, Bulgarian opera singer
- Ivaylo Petkov (born 1976), Bulgarian footballer
- Kiril Petkov (born 1980), Bulgarian prime minister from 2021 to 2022
- Kristina Petkova (born 1991), Bulgarian politician
- Lyudmila Petkova (born 1967), Bulgarian politician
- Marin Petkov (footballer) (born 2002), Bulgarian footballer
- Mario Petkov (footballer, born 1996), Bulgarian footballer
- Mariya Petkova (born 1950), Bulgarian discus thrower
- Martin Petkov (footballer, born 2001), Bulgarian footballer
- Martin Petkov (footballer, born 2002), Bulgarian footballer
- Milen Petkov (born 1974), Bulgarian footballer
- Nedelya Petkova (1826–1894), Bulgarian education pioneer
- Nelly Petkova (born 1983), Bulgarian singer
- Nelly Petkova (journalist) (born 1960), Russian journalist
- Nicolai Petkov, Dutch computer scientist
- Nikola Petkov (1893–1947), Bulgarian politician
- Ogniana Petkova (born 1964), Bulgarian sprint canoeist and 1998 Olympic bronze medallist
- Petko Petkov (footballer) (1946–2020), Bulgarian football player and manager
- Petko Petkov (football manager) (born 1968), Bulgarian football manager and former player
- Petko Petkov (volleyball) (born 1958), Bulgarian volleyball player
- Petrana Petkova (born 1972), Bulgarian runner
- Rayna Petkova (1895–1957), Social worker
- Rosica Petkova (born 1947), Bulgarian composer
- Rossen Petkov (born 1967), Bulgarian writer and teacher
- Simona Petkova (born 1993), Bulgarian footballer
- Temenuzhka Petkova (born 1967), Bulgarian politician
- Vanya Petkova (1944–2009), Bulgarian poet
- Vladimir Petkov (born 1971), Bulgarian chess grandmaster
- Zhivko Petkov (born 1993), Bulgarian footballer
