= Bulgaria at the 2022 European Athletics Championships =

- Flag of Bulgaria
- WA code: BUL
- National federation: Bulgarian Athletic Federation

in Munich, Germany 15 August 2022 – 21 August 2022
- Competitors: 6 (2 men and 4 women) in 5 events
- Medals: Gold 0 Silver 0 Bronze 0 Total 0

European Athletics Championships appearances
- 1934; 1938–1950; 1954; 1958; 1962; 1966; 1969; 1971; 1974; 1978; 1982; 1986; 1990; 1994; 1998; 2002; 2006; 2010; 2012; 2014; 2016; 2018; 2022; 2024

Bulgaria competed at the 2022 European Athletics Championships in Munich, Germany, between 15 and 21 August 2022

== Results ==
Bulgaria entered the following athletes.

Key

- Q = Qualified for the next round
- q = Qualified for the next round as a fastest loser or, in field events, by position without achieving the qualifying target
- NR = National record
- PB = Personal best
- SB = Season best
- N/A = Round not applicable for the event

=== Men ===
Field events

Athlete	Event	Qualification		Final	
Athlete	Event	Distance	Position	Distance	Position
Tihomir Ivanov	High jump	2.21 =SB	3 q	2.18	8
Georgi Nachev	Triple jump	16.04 w	13	did not advance	

=== Women ===
Road events

Athletes	Event	Final	
Athletes	Event	Result	Rank
Militsa Mircheva	Marathon	Did not finish	
Marinela Nineva	Marathon	2:45:40 SB	45

Field events

Athlete	Event	Qualification		Final	
Athlete	Event	Distance	Position	Distance	Position
Mirela Demireva	High jump	1.87	9 q	1.86	9
Aleksandra Nacheva	Triple jump	13.73	11 q	13.33	11
