= Bulgaria at the 2017 World Championships in Athletics =

- Flag of Bulgaria
- WA code: BUL
- National federation: Bulgarian Athletic Federation
- Website: bfla.org (in Bulgarian)

in London, United Kingdom 4–13 August 2017
- Competitors: 8 (4 men and 4 women) in 7 events
- Medals: Gold 0 Silver 0 Bronze 0 Total 0

World Championships in Athletics appearances
- 1983; 1987; 1991; 1993; 1995; 1997; 1999; 2001; 2003; 2005; 2007; 2009; 2011; 2013; 2015; 2017; 2019; 2022; 2023; 2025

Bulgaria competed at the 2017 World Championships in Athletics in London, United Kingdom, 4–13 August 2017.

== Results ==
=== Men ===
Track and road events

Athlete	Event	Heat		Semifinal		Final	
Athlete	Event	Result	Rank	Result	Rank	Result	Rank
Mitko Tsenov	3000 metres steeplechase	8:45.21	37	—N/a		Did not advance	

Field events

Athlete	Event	Qualification		Final	
Athlete	Event	Distance	Position	Distance	Position
Tihomir Ivanov	High jump	2.31 PB	3 Q	NH	–
Momchil Karailiev	Triple jump	16.57	15	Did not advance	
Georgi Tsonov	Triple jump	16.53	18	Did not advance	

=== Women ===
Track and road events

Athlete	Event	Heat		Semifinal		Final	
Athlete	Event	Result	Rank	Result	Rank	Result	Rank
Ivet Lalova-Collio	100 metres	11.31	23 Q	11.25 SB	19	Did not advance	
Ivet Lalova-Collio	200 metres	23.08	12 Q	22.96	9	Did not advance	

Field events

Athlete	Event	Qualification		Final	
Athlete	Event	Distance	Position	Distance	Position
Mirela Demireva	High jump	1.92	6 q	1.92	7
Gabriela Petrova	Triple jump	13.90	17	Did not advance	
Radoslava Mavrodieva	Shot put	16.99	21	Did not advance	
