= Bulgaria at the 2024 European Athletics Championships =

- Flag of Bulgaria
- WA code: BUL

in Rome, Italy 7 June 2024 – 12 June 2022
- Competitors: 10 (4 men and 6 women)

European Athletics Championships appearances
- 1934; 1938–1950; 1954; 1958; 1962; 1966; 1969; 1971; 1974; 1978; 1982; 1986; 1990; 1994; 1998; 2002; 2006; 2010; 2012; 2014; 2016; 2018; 2022; 2024

Bulgaria competed at the 2024 European Athletics Championships in Rome, Italy from 7–12 June 2024.

== Medallists ==
Medal	Name	Event	Date

== Results ==
Bulgaria entered the following athletes.

Key

- Q = Qualified for the next round
- q = Qualified for the next round as a fastest loser or, in field events, by position without achieving the qualifying target
- NR = National record
- PB = Personal best
- SB = Season best
- N/A = Round not applicable for the event

=== Men ===
Field events

Athlete	Event	Qualification		Final	
Athlete	Event	Distance	Position	Distance	Position
Tihomir Ivanov	High jump	2.21	1 q	2.22	6
Bozhidar Saraboyukov	Long jump	8.04	7 Q	8.08	6
Dimitar Tashev	Triple jump	NM		Did not advance	
Lachezar Valchev	Triple jump	15.96	21	Did not advance	

=== Women ===
Track and road events

Athlete	Event	Heat		Semifinal		Final	
Athlete	Event	Result	Rank	Result	Rank	Result	Rank
Yasna Petrova	10,000 metres	—N/a				34:56.89	28
Militsa Mircheva	Half marathon	—N/a				1:16:30	59

Field events

Athlete	Event	Qualification		Final	
Athlete	Event	Distance	Position	Distance	Position
Mirela Demireva	High jump	1.89	7 q	1.93 =SB	4
Plamena Mitkova	Long jump	6.71 PB	6 Q	6.80 PB	7
Aleksandra Nacheva	Triple jump	14.29 PB	1 Q	14.35 PB	4
Gabriela Petrova	Triple jump	13.86	12 q	14.16	6
