= Bulgaria at the 2015 World Championships in Athletics =

- WA code: BUL
- Website: www.bfla.org

in Beijing
- Competitors: 10
- Medals: Gold 0 Silver 0 Bronze 0 Total 0

World Championships in Athletics appearances
- 1983; 1987; 1991; 1993; 1995; 1997; 1999; 2001; 2003; 2005; 2007; 2009; 2011; 2013; 2015; 2017; 2019; 2022; 2023; 2025

Bulgaria competed at the 2015 World Championships in Athletics in Beijing, China, from 22 to 30 August 2015.

== Results ==
(q – qualified, NM – no mark, SB – season best)

=== Men ===
Track and road events

Athlete	Event	Heat		Semifinal		Final	
Athlete	Event	Result	Rank	Result	Rank	Result	Rank
Mitko Tsenov	3000 metres steeplechase	9:02.72	35	—N/a		did not advance	

Field events

Athlete	Event	Qualification		Final	
Athlete	Event	Distance	Position	Distance	Position
Georgi Tsonov	Triple jump	16.59	16	did not advance	
Rumen Dimitrov	Triple jump	16.53	17	did not advance	
Georgi Ivanov	Shot put	NM		did not advance	

=== Women ===
Track and road events

Athlete	Event	Heat		Semifinal		Final	
Athlete	Event	Result	Rank	Result	Rank	Result	Rank
Inna Eftimova	100 metres	11.50	38	did not advance		did not advance	
Ivet Lalova-Collio	100 metres	11.09 SB	10 Q	11.13	14	did not advance	
Ivet Lalova-Collio	200 metres	22.54 SB	4 Q	22.32 PB	5 q	22.41	7
Silvia Danekova	3000 metres steeplechase	9:46.31	28	—N/a		did not advance	

Field events

Athlete	Event	Qualification		Final	
Athlete	Event	Distance	Position	Distance	Position
Mirela Demireva	High jump	1.92	12 q	1.88	9
Venelina Veneva-Mateeva	High jump	1.80	28	did not advance	
Gabriela Petrova	Triple jump	14.44	1 Q	14.66 PB	4
