= Bulgaria at the 1934 European Athletics Championships =

- WA code: BUL
- National federation: BFLA
- Website: www.bfla.org

in Turin
- Competitors: 2 (2 men) in 2 events
- Medals: Gold 0 Silver 0 Bronze 0 Total 0

European Athletics Championships appearances
- 1934; 1938–1950; 1954; 1958; 1962; 1966; 1969; 1971; 1974; 1978; 1982; 1986; 1990; 1994; 1998; 2002; 2006; 2010; 2012; 2014; 2016; 2018; 2022; 2024

Bulgaria competed at the 1934 European Athletics Championships in Turin, Italy, between 7 and 9 September 1934.

== Results ==
Men

Field Events

Athlete	Event	Qualification		Final	
Athlete	Event	Distance	Rank	Distance	Rank
Lyuben Doychev	Pole vault	3.60	=1 Q	3.70	10
Kamen Ganchev	Discus throw	40.28		did not advance	
