= Bulgaria at the 2011 World Championships in Athletics =

- WA code: BUL
- National federation: Bulgarian Athletic Federation
- Website: www.bfla.org

in Daegu
- Competitors: 7
- Medals: Gold 0 Silver 0 Bronze 0 Total 0

World Championships in Athletics appearances
- 1983; 1987; 1991; 1993; 1995; 1997; 1999; 2001; 2003; 2005; 2007; 2009; 2011; 2013; 2015; 2017; 2019; 2022; 2023

The Bulgarian team at the 2011 World Championships in Athletics held in Daegu, South Korea included seven athletes led by sprinter Ivet Lalova.

== Results ==
=== Men ===
Athlete	Event	Preliminaries		Heats		Semifinals		Final	
Athlete	Event	Time Width Height	Rank	Time Width Height	Rank	Time Width Height	Rank	Time Width Height	Rank
Viktor Ninov	High jump	2.28m	18					Did not advance	

=== Women ===
Athlete	Event	Preliminaries		Heats		Semifinals		Final	
Athlete	Event	Time Width Height	Rank	Time Width Height	Rank	Time Width Height	Rank	Time Width Height	Rank
Ivet Lalova	100 metres			11.10 Q	1	11.23 Q	6	11.27	7
Inna Eftimova	100 metres			11.36	23	Not advance			
Ivet Lalova	200 metres			22.62 SB	2	23.03	13	Did not advance	
Vania Stambolova	400 m hurdles			55.29 Q	8	54.72 Q	3	54.23	6
Andriyana Banova	Triple jump	13.66m	26					Did not advance	
Venelina Veneva-Mateeva	High jump	1.89	21					Did not advance	
Radoslava Mavrodieva	Shot put	15.76 m	25					Not advance	
