= Petkovski =

Petkovski (Macedonian: Петковски), female form Petkovska is a Macedonian surname that is the equivalent of Bulgarian Petkov, it may refer to:

- Alexandra Petkovski
- Tito Petkovski (b. 1945), Yugoslav and Macedonian politician
- Dragana Petkovska
- Ivana Petkovska, represented Macedonia in the Junior Eurovision Song Contest 2015

== See also ==
- Petković
- Petkov
