= Bulgaria at the 2019 World Athletics Championships =

- Flag of Bulgaria
- WA code: BUL
- National federation: Bulgarian Athletic Federation
- Website: bfla.org (in Bulgarian)

in Doha, Qatar 27 September–6 October 2019
- Competitors: 7 (2 men and 5 women) in 6 events
- Medals: Gold 0 Silver 0 Bronze 0 Total 0

World Championships in Athletics appearances
- 1983; 1987; 1991; 1993; 1995; 1997; 1999; 2001; 2003; 2005; 2007; 2009; 2011; 2013; 2015; 2017; 2019; 2022; 2023

Bulgaria competed at the 2019 World Athletics Championships in Doha, Qatar, 27 September–6 October 2019.

== Results ==
=== Men ===
Field events

Athlete	Event	Qualification		Final	
Athlete	Event	Distance	Position	Distance	Position
Tihomir Ivanov	High jump	2.26	16	Did not advance	
Georgi Tsonov	Triple jump	16.61	21	Did not advance	

=== Women ===
Track and road events

Athlete	Event	Heat		Semifinal		Final	
Athlete	Event	Result	Rank	Result	Rank	Result	Rank
Inna Eftimova	100 metres	11.79	41	Did not advance			
Ivet Lalova-Collio	200 metres	22.79	12 Q	22.58	7 Q	22.77	7

Field events

Athlete	Event	Qualification		Final	
Athlete	Event	Distance	Position	Distance	Position
Mirela Demireva	High jump	1.94	6 Q	1.89	10
Gabriela Petrova	Triple jump	13.98	16	Did not advance	
Aleksandra Nacheva	Triple jump	13.05	26	Did not advance	
