= Petko =

Petko is a South Slavic (Петко) masculine given name and East Slavic (Петько) surname. It may refer to:

== Given name ==
- Petko Petkov (disambiguation)
- Petko Slaveykov (1827–1895), 19th-century Bulgarian poet, publicist, public figure and folklorist
- Petko Staynov (1896–1977), Bulgarian composer and pianist
- Petko Voyvoda (1844–1900), 19th-century Bulgarian revolutionary
- Petko Yankov (born 1977), retired Bulgarian sprinter
- Petko Karavelov (1843–1903), leading Bulgarian liberal politician
- Petko Ilić (1886–1912), Serbian Chetnik
- Petko Hristov (born 1999), Bulgarian football player

== Surname ==
- Svetlana Petko (born 1970), professional Russian football goalkeeper
- Serhiy Petko (born 1994), professional Ukrainian football midfielder
- Miroslav Petko (born 1995), professional Slovak footballer

== Geography ==
- Petko Slaveykov (village), a village in the municipality of Sevlievo, in Gabrovo Province, in northern central Bulgaria
- Kapitan Petko voyvoda, a village in the municipality of Topolovgrad, in Haskovo Province, in southern Bulgaria
- Petko Voyvoda Peak, in the Delchev Ridge, Tangra Mountains, Livingston Island, Antarctica
