= Bulgaria at the 2022 World Athletics Championships =

- WA code: BUL
- National federation: BFLA
- Website: bfla.org

in Eugene, United States 15–24 July 2022
- Competitors: 1 (0 men and 1 woman)

World Athletics Championships appearances
- 1983; 1987; 1991; 1993; 1995; 1997; 1999; 2001; 2003; 2005; 2007; 2009; 2011; 2013; 2015; 2017; 2019; 2022; 2023

Bulgaria competed at the 2022 World Athletics Championships in Eugene, United States, from 15 to 24 July 2022. Bulgaria entered 1 athlete.

== Results ==
=== Women ===
Key

- NR = National record
- PB = Personal best
- SB = Season best

Track and Field Events

Athlete	Event	Final	
Athlete	Event	Result	Rank
Militsa Mircheva	Marathon	2:30:20	15
