= Bulgaria at the 2009 World Championships in Athletics =

- WA code: BUL

in Berlin
- Competitors: 11 (5 men, 6 women)
- Medals: Gold 0 Silver 0 Bronze 0 Total 0

World Championships in Athletics appearances
- 1983; 1987; 1991; 1993; 1995; 1997; 1999; 2001; 2003; 2005; 2007; 2009; 2011; 2013; 2015; 2017; 2019; 2022; 2023

Bulgaria competed at the 2009 World Championships in Athletics from 15 to 23 August in Berlin. The team won no medals; the only athlete to reach the finals of their event was Momchil Karailiev in the triple jump.

== Team selection ==
Track and road events

Event	Athletes	
Event	Men	Women
100 metres	Desislav Gunev	Ivet Lalova
200 metres	Desislav Gunev	Ivet Lalova
400 metre hurdles		Tsvetelina Kirilova; Vania Stambolova

Field and combined events

Event	Athletes	
Event	Men	Women
High jump		Venelina Veneva-Mateeva
Long jump	Nikolay Atanasov	
Triple jump	Momchil Karailiev	Petia Dacheva
Pole vault	Spas Bukhalov	
Shot Put	Georgi Ivanov	
Discus throw		Venera Getova

== Results ==
=== Men ===
Track and road events

Event	Athletes	Heats		Quarterfinal		Semifinal		Final	
Event	Athletes	Result	Rank	Result	Rank	Result	Rank	Result	Rank
100 m	Desislav Gunev	11.07	72	did not advance					
200 m	Desislav Gunev	DNF		did not advance					

Field and combined events

Event	Athletes	Qualification		Final	
Event	Athletes	Result	Rank	Result	Rank
Long jump	Nikolay Atanasov	7.63	37	did not advance	
Triple jump	Momchil Karailiev	17.07	7	16.82	9
Pole vault	Spas Bukhalov	5.40	22	did not advance	
Shot put	Georgi Ivanov	18.11	34	did not advance	

=== Women ===
Track and road events

Event	Athletes	Heats		Quarterfinal		Semifinal		Final	
Event	Athletes	Result	Rank	Result	Rank	Result	Rank	Result	Rank
100 m	Ivet Lalova	11.48 SB	22	11.54	27	did not advance			
200 m	Ivet Lalova	23.60 SB	31	-		did not advance			
400 m hurdles	Tsvetelina Kirilova	DQ		-		did not advance			
400 m hurdles	Vania Stambolova	56.01	16	-		56.12	15	did not advance	

Field and combined events

Event	Athletes	Qualification		Final	
Event	Athletes	Result	Rank	Result	Rank
High jump	Venelina Veneva-Mateeva	1.92	15	did not advance	
Triple jump	Petia Dacheva	14.11	14	did not advance	
Discus throw	Venera Getova	53.33	36	did not advance	
