= Bulgaria at the 1978 European Athletics Championships =

- WA code: BUL

in Prague
- Competitors: 24
- Medals: Gold 0 Silver 0 Bronze 1 Total 1

European Athletics Championships appearances
- 1934; 1938–1950; 1954; 1958; 1962; 1966; 1969; 1971; 1974; 1978; 1982; 1986; 1990; 1994; 1998; 2002; 2006; 2010; 2012; 2014; 2016; 2018; 2022; 2024

Bulgaria took 24 athletes to the 1978 European Athletics Championships which took place 29 August–3 September 1978 in Prague. Bulgaria won one medal at the Championships.

== Medalists ==
Medal	Name	Event	Result
3rd place, bronze medalist(s)	Totka Petrova	Women's 1500m	4.00,15
