= Alexander Kandov =

Bulgarian composer (born 1949)

Alexander Kandov (Bulgarian: Александър Кандов) (b. Sofia, Bulgaria, 1949) is a Bulgarian composer.

== Biography ==
Kandov attended the Bulgarian State Academy of Music, and studied Composition under Dimitar Tapkoff and Piano under Liuba Obretenova.

He worked as a music editor at the Bulgarian National Radio and at Musica Publishing House, and lectured in Polyphony at the Bulgarian State Academy of Music.

From 1982 to 1990, he was Chairman of the Young Composers’ Section at the Union of Bulgarian Composers.

Throughout his career as a composer, his works have been commissioned for the recording company Balkanton and for Bulgarian National Radio.

Since 1990, he has lived in Spain, where he continues to compose and teach.

== Works ==
=== Stage music ===
Monodrama, lyrics by R. Akugatawa (1983)
A Cube Game (musical for children)
Tragnal kos (A Blackbird Embarked on a Journey) (ballet)
Short Gramophone Tales

=== Orchestral music ===
Youth Symphony (1976)
Sonata for Orchestra (1979)
Epitaphs for violin, orchestra and organ, after poems by Teodor Trayanov (1981)
Music for Orchestra (1985)
Ode for soprano, alto, baritone, organ and orchestra (1987)
Apotheosis for tenor and orchestra (1988)

=== Chamber music ===
Endurance for two voices, viola, flute, French horn and piano, on poems by Emily Dickinson (1979)
Procession for flute, French horn and harp (1995)

=== Piano music ===
Variants, a cycle (1975)
Night Butterflies (1993)
Concerto for two pianos (1983)
Fabliau after pictures by Nikolay Maystorov for 5 pianos (1994)

=== Organ music ===
Sonata (1976)

=== Electronic and electroacoustic music ===
Heterotempi (1981)
Crystals Of The Zodiac for marimba, piano and tape (1989)
