= Bulgaria at the 2013 World Championships in Athletics =

- WA code: BUL

in Moscow
- Competitors: 10
- Medals: Gold 0 Silver 0 Bronze 0 Total 0

World Championships in Athletics appearances
- 1983; 1987; 1991; 1993; 1995; 1997; 1999; 2001; 2003; 2005; 2007; 2009; 2011; 2013; 2015; 2017; 2019; 2022; 2023; 2025

Bulgaria competed at the 2013 World Championships in Athletics in Moscow, Russia, from 10–18 August 2013. A team of ten athletes was announced to represent the country in the event.

== Results ==
(q – qualified, NM – no mark, SB – season best)

=== Men ===
Track and road events

Athlete	Event	Preliminaries		Heats		Semifinals		Final	
Athlete	Event	Time	Rank	Time	Rank	Time	Rank	Time	Rank
Denis Dimitrov	100 metres			10.29	30	Did not advance			
Mitko Tsenov	3000 metres steeplechase			8.32.49	24			did not advance	

Field events

Athlete	Event	Preliminaries		Final	
Athlete	Event	Width Height	Rank	Width Height	Rank
Zlatozar Atanasov	Triple jump	16.21	19	did not advance	
Viktor Ninov	High jump	Withdrew			
Georgi Ivanov	Shot put	20.40	6 q	20.39	8

=== Women ===
Track and road events

Athlete	Event	Preliminaries		Heats		Semifinals		Final	
Athlete	Event	Time	Rank	Time	Rank	Time	Rank	Time	Rank
Ivet Lalova	100 metres			11.18	10 Q	11.10	9	did not advance	
Ivet Lalova	200 metres			22.92	16 q	22.81	=9	did not advance	
Vania Stambolova	400 metres hurdles			55.91	14 Q	56.58	15	did not advance	
Silvia Danekova	3000 metres steeplechase			9:35.66	5 Q NR			9:58.57	14

Field events

Athlete	Event	Preliminaries		Final	
Athlete	Event	Width Height	Rank	Width Height	Rank
Mirela Demireva	High jump	1.83	26	did not advance	
Radoslava Mavrodieva	Shot put	17.34	19	did not advance	
