= Petko Petkov =

Petko Petkov may refer to:

- Petko Petkov (chess composer) (1942−2024), see World Championship of Chess Composition
- Petko Petkov (footballer) (1946−2020), Bulgarian football player and manager
- Petko Petkov (football manager) (born 1968), Bulgarian football manager and former player
- Petko Petkov (volleyball) (born 1958), Bulgarian former volleyball player

== See also ==
- Petkov (surname)
