= Cinderella (Disney character) =

Title character in the 1950 Disney animated film of the same name

- Cinderella character
- Cinderella in her signature ball gown
- First appearance: Cinderella (1950)
- Created by: Marc Davis; Eric Larson; Les Clark; Walt Disney
- Based on: Cinderella by Charles Perrault
- Voiced by: Ilene Woods (1950 film); June Foray (1954 record album); Anne Lloyd (1955 record album); Patricia Parris (1977 Disney Read-Along); Kath Soucie (Disney Parks); Jennifer Hale (2000–present); Tami Tappan (singing in Cinderella III); Karen Strassman (Mickey Mouse); Susan Stevens Logan (studio singing voice)
- Portrayed by: Lily James (2015 film); Eloise Webb (child) (2015 film); Brandy Norwood (Descendants); Morgan Dudley (young) (Descendants: The Rise of Red)

In-universe information
- Occupation: Scullery maid (former); Princess consort
- Affiliation: Disney Princesses
- Family: Unnamed father (deceased); Unnamed mother (deceased); Lady Tremaine (stepmother); Drizella Tremaine (stepsister); Anastasia Tremaine (stepsister)
- Spouse: Prince Charming
- Children: Chad Charming (Descendants); Chloe Charming (Descendants)
- Relatives: The King (father-in-law)
- Nationality: French

Cinderella is a fictional character who appears in Walt Disney Pictures' animated film of the same name released in 1950. Voiced by Ilene Woods, the character is adapted from the character from folk tales, primarily the French version written by Charles Perrault in 1697. For the sequels and subsequent film and television appearances, Woods was replaced by actresses Jennifer Hale and Tami Tappan, who provide the character's speaking and singing voices, although Hale later assumed the singing role in both Sofia the First and Disney's centenary short film Once Upon a Studio.

In the wake of her father's untimely demise, Cinderella is left in the care of her cruel stepmother and two jealous stepsisters, who constantly mistreat her, forcing Cinderella to work as a scullery maid in her own home. When Prince Charming holds a ball, the evil stepmother does not allow her to go. Cinderella, aided by her kind Fairy Godmother and equipped with a beautiful silver gown and a unique pair of glass slippers, attends, only to have to leave at midnight when the Fairy Godmother's spell is broken.

Reception towards Cinderella has been mixed, with some film critics describing the character as much too passive, one-dimensional and less interesting than the film's supporting characters. Other critics found her endearing, charming and timeless. Woods' vocal performance has also been praised. Cinderella has nonetheless become one of the most famous and recognizable princesses in the history of film. She is also the second Disney Princess. With her iconic glass slippers, silver gown, hairstyle and transformation, one of the first on-screen makeovers of its kind, the character has been established as a fashion icon, receiving accolades and recognition from InStyle, Entertainment Weekly, Glamour and Oprah.com, as well as footwear designer and fashion icon Christian Louboutin, who, in 2012, designed and released a shoe based on Cinderella's glass slippers. Lily James played a live-action version of the character in the 2015 live-action adaptation of the original film. Brandy Norwood portrayed her in the live-action films Descendants: The Rise of Red and Descendants: Wicked Wonderland, with Morgan Dudley playing her teenage self in The Rise of Red.

== Development ==
The Disney version of Cinderella was based on the French version of the tale by Charles Perrault, Cendrillon written in 1697 in Histoires ou Contes du Temps Passé.

=== Personality ===
The script for the original film went through revisions by various writers, sometimes with different interpretations of the character. Maurice Rapf tried to make her a less passive character than Snow White, and more rebellious against her stepfamily. Rapf explained, "My thinking was you can't have somebody who comes in and changes everything for you. You can't be delivered it on a platter. You've got to earn it. So in my version, the Fairy Godmother said, 'It's okay till midnight but from then on it's up to you.' I made her earn it, and what she had to do to achieve it was to rebel against her stepmother and stepsisters, to stop being a slave in her own home. So I had a scene where they're ordering her around and she throws the stuff back at them. She revolts, so they lock her up in the attic. I don't think anyone took (my idea) very seriously."

=== Appearance ===
The character was animated by Marc Davis and Eric Larson, but the two animators did not have the same perception of the character, accentuating the elegance of Davis and Larson's opting for simplicity. As with other Disney films, Walt Disney hired actress Helene Stanley to perform the live-action reference for Cinderella and the artists drew animated frames based on the movements of the actress. This technique was also used for the characters of Princess Aurora (Mary Costa) in Sleeping Beauty and Anita Radcliff (Lisa Davis) in 101 Dalmatians. Inspiration for Cinderella's facial features were said to have been inspired by Ingrid Bergman.

According to Christopher Finch, author of The Art of Walt Disney:

Disney insisted that all scenes involving human characters should be shot first in live-action to determine that they would work before the expensive business of animation was permitted to start. The animators did not like this way of working, feeling it detracted from their ability to create character. However, they understood the necessity for this approach in retrospect and acknowledged that Disney had handled things with considerable subtlety.

=== Voice ===
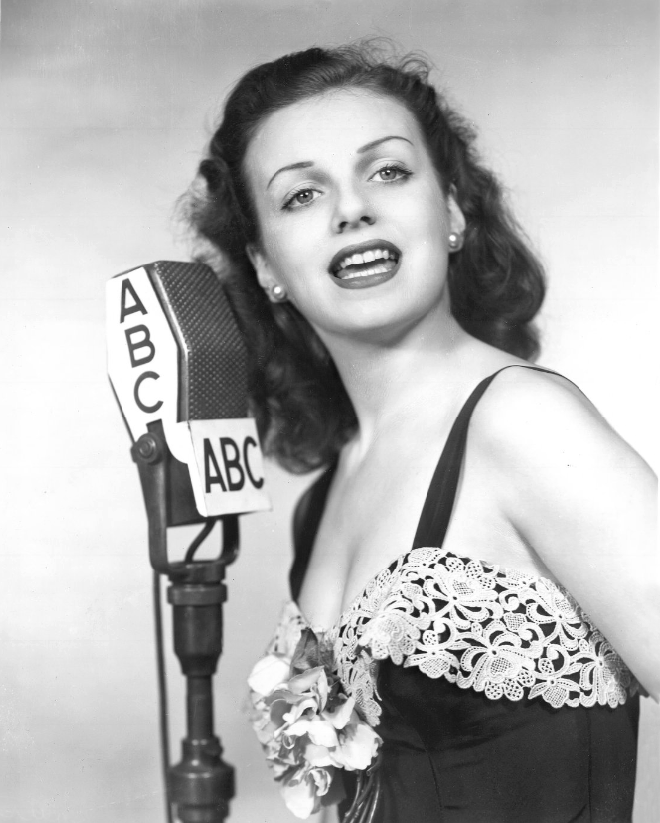
Ilene Woods was the voice actress for the character in the original film.

In the original 1950 film, Cinderella is voiced by American singer and actress Ilene Woods. In 1948, Woods was a young eighteen-year-old singer working as a radio personality at the time and hosting her own eponymous radio program The Ilene Woods Show. While working at ABC Radio, Woods would regularly be visited and approached by various songwriters who wanted the singer to perform their compositions, which is ultimately how she met and befriended Cinderella songwriters Mack David and Jerry Livingston. Ultimately, David and Livingston "would play ... an important role in Woods's career."

At the behest of David and Livingston, casually described as "a favor", Woods agreed to record a series of demos of three songs that the songwriters had recently written for the studio's then-upcoming animated film Cinderella. Woods recorded the songs "Bibbidi-Bobbidi-Boo", "So This Is Love", and "A Dream Is a Wish Your Heart Makes", which the songwriters then submitted to Disney himself. Upon reviewing and listening to the tracks, Disney, impressed, decided to contact Woods personally. Two days afterward, Woods received a telephone call from Disney, with whom she immediately scheduled an interview. Woods recalled in an interview with the Los Angeles Times, "We met and talked for a while, and he said, 'How would you like to be Cinderella?'", to which she agreed.

==== International voices ====
Cinderella was originally dubbed into eight other languages aside from English upon its release in 1950. In later years, more countries would dub the film and its sequels, and several dubs were replaced or redubbed.

Cinderella's international dubbers
| Language | Release years of dub | | | | Voice | | | |
| Language | Cinderella | Cinderella II | Cinderella III | Cinderella (live-action) | Cinderella | Cinderella II | Cinderella III | Cinderella (live-action) |
|---|---|---|---|---|---|---|---|---|
| Arabic (Egypt) | 1998 | 2002 | 2022 | Not dubbed | رولا زكي (Rula Zaky) | | داليا فريد (Dalia Farid) | Not dubbed |
| Arabic (Modern Standard) | 2014 | 2014 | 2014 | 2015 | سارة الجوهري (Sarah Al-Gawhary) | سارة الجوهري (Sarah Al-Gawhary) | سارة الجوهري (Sarah Al-Gawhary) | إيناس صبري (Inas Sabry) |
| Arabic (Modern Standard) | 2022 | 2014 | 2022 | 2015 | داليا فريد (Dalia Farid) | سارة الجوهري (Sarah Al-Gawhary) | داليا فريد (Dalia Farid) | إيناس صبري (Inas Sabry) |
| Belarusian | Not dubbed | | | 2021 | Not dubbed | | | Вераніка Пляшкевіч (Vyeranika Plyashkyevich) |
| Bulgarian | 2005 | 2018 | Not dubbed | 2015 | Петя Абаджиева (Petya Abadzhieva) (speaking) | —N/a | Not dubbed | Avgustina-Kalina Petkova |
| Bulgarian | 2005 | 2018 | Not dubbed | 2015 | Нели Андреева (Neli Andreeva) (singing) | —N/a | Not dubbed | Avgustina-Kalina Petkova |
| Cantonese | 1996 | Not dubbed | 2007 | 2015 | —N/a | Not dubbed | 杜雯惠 (Dou Man-Wai "Ada To") (speaking) | 溫卓妍 (Wan Cheuk-Yin "Jarita Wan") |
| Cantonese | 1996 | Not dubbed | 2007 | 2015 | —N/a | Not dubbed | 高少華 (Gou Siu-Waa "Silver Ko") (singing) | 溫卓妍 (Wan Cheuk-Yin "Jarita Wan") |
| Chinese (China) | 2010 | 2002 | 2015 | 2015 | 白雪 (Bái Xuě) | —N/a | | 张雪凌 (Zhāng Xuě-Líng) (speaking) |
| Chinese (China) | 2010 | 2002 | 2015 | 2015 | 白雪 (Bái Xuě) | —N/a | | 李潇潇 (Lǐ Xiāo-Xiāo "Eva Li") (singing) |
| Chinese (Taiwan) | 1991 | 2002 | 2015 | Not dubbed | 王華怡 (Wáng Huá-Yí) (speaking) | —N/a | | Not dubbed |
| Chinese (Taiwan) | 1991 | 2002 | 2015 | Not dubbed | 宋文 (Sòng Wén "Ariel Sung) (singing) | —N/a | | Not dubbed |
| Croatian | 2005 | Not dubbed | | | Jasna Palić-Picukarić (speaking) | Not dubbed | | |
| Croatian | 2005 | Not dubbed | | | Mima Karaula (singing) | Not dubbed | | |
| Czech | 1970 | 2002 | 2007 | 2015 | Klára Jerneková (speaking) | Tereza Chudobová | Tereza Chudobová (speaking) | Barbora Šedivá |
| Czech | 1970 | 2002 | 2007 | 2015 | Marie Sikulová (singing) | Tereza Chudobová | Tereza Chudobová (speaking) | Barbora Šedivá |
| Czech | 2005 | 2002 | 2007 | 2015 | Tereza Chudobová (speaking) | Tereza Chudobová | Štepánka Heřmánková (singing) | Barbora Šedivá |
| Czech | 2005 | 2002 | 2007 | 2015 | Štepánka Heřmánková (singing) | Tereza Chudobová | Štepánka Heřmánková (singing) | Barbora Šedivá |
| Danish | 2005 | 2002 | 2007 | 2015 | Lise Ringheim | Kaya Brüel | | Sofie Topp-Duss |
| Dutch | 1950 | 2002 | 2007 | 2015 | Loekie Landweer | Ingeborg Wieten | | Caro Lenssen (speaking and singing "Sing Sweet Nightengale) |
| Dutch | 1991 | 2002 | 2007 | 2015 | Joke de Kruijf | Ingeborg Wieten | | Ziggy Wijnberg (singing all but "Sing Sweet Nightengale") |
| English | 1950 | 2002 | 2007 | 2015 | Ilene Woods | Jennifer Hale | Jennifer Hale (speaking) | Lily James |
| English | 1950 | 2002 | 2007 | 2015 | Ilene Woods | Jennifer Hale | Tami Tappan-Damiano (singing) | Lily James |
| Filipino | Not dubbed | | | 2019 | Not dubbed | | | —N/a |
| Finnish | 1967 | 2002 | 2007 | 2015 | Ritva Lehtelä | Anna Kuoppamäki | | Alina Tomnikov |
| Finnish | 1992 | 2002 | 2007 | 2015 | Anna Kuoppamäki | Anna Kuoppamäki | | Alina Tomnikov |
| Flemish | Not dubbed | | | 2015 | Not dubbed | | | Daphne Paelinck |
| French (Canada) | Not dubbed | 2002 | 2007 | 2015 | Not dubbed | Violette Chauveau | Violette Chauveau (speaking) | Kim Jalabert (speaking and singing "Sing Sweet Nightengale) |
| French (Canada) | Not dubbed | 2002 | 2007 | 2015 | Not dubbed | Violette Chauveau | Nancy Fortin (singing) | Élise Cormier (singing all but "Sing Sweet Nightengale") |
| French (France) | 1950 | 2002 | 2007 | 2015 | Paule Marsay (speaking) | Laura Blanc | Laura Blanc (speaking) | Alexia Papineschi |
| French (France) | 1950 | 2002 | 2007 | 2015 | Paulette Rollin (singing) | Laura Blanc | Laura Blanc (speaking) | Alexia Papineschi |
| French (France) | 1991 | 2002 | 2007 | 2015 | Dominique Poulain | Laura Blanc | Karine Costa (singing) | Alexia Papineschi |
| German | 1951 | 2002 | 2007 | 2015 | Eva Ingeborg Scholz | Marie Bierstedt | Marie Bierstedt (speaking) | Friederike Walke |
| German | 1951 | 2002 | 2007 | 2015 | Eva Ingeborg Scholz | Marie Bierstedt | Jana Werner (singing) | Friederike Walke |
| Greek | 1999 | 2002 | 2007 | 2015 | Άριελ Κωνσταντινίδη (Áriel Konstantinídi) (speaking) | Άριελ Κωνσταντινίδη (Áriel Konstantinídi) | | Ινώ Στεφανή (Inó Stefaní) (speaking) |
| Greek | 1999 | 2002 | 2007 | 2015 | Άννα Ρόσση (Anna Rossi) (singing) | Άριελ Κωνσταντινίδη (Áriel Konstantinídi) | | Έλενα Στρατηγοπούλου (Elena Stratigopoulou) (singing) |
| Hebrew | 1991 | 2002 | 2022 | 2015 | טל אמיר (Tal Amir) | מיכל צפיר (Michal Tsafir) | אלונה אלכסנדר (Alona Alexander) | משי קלינשטיין (Meshi Kleinstein) |
| Hindi | 2005 | 2002 | 2007 | 2002 | —N/a | | | |
| Hungarian | 1958 | 2002 | 2007 | 2015 | Pap Éva (speaking and singing all songs except "So This is Love") | F. Nagy Erika | F. Nagy Erika (speaking) | Mórocz Adrienn |
| Hungarian | 1958 | 2002 | 2007 | 2015 | Tiboldi Mária (singing "So This is Love") | F. Nagy Erika | Tunyogi Bernadett (singing) | Mórocz Adrienn |
| Icelandic | 1998 | 2002 | 2007 | Not dubbed | Vigdís Hrefna Pálsdóttir (speaking and singing A Dream is a Wish, Part 1) | Vigdís Hrefna Pálsdóttir | Álfrún Örnólfsdóttir | Not dubbed |
| Icelandic | 1998 | 2002 | 2007 | Not dubbed | Þórunn Lárusdóttir (singing all songs except A Dream is a Wish, Part 1) | Vigdís Hrefna Pálsdóttir | Álfrún Örnólfsdóttir | Not dubbed |
| Indonesian | 2013 | 2013 | 2011 | —N/a | Tisa Julanti | | Beatrix Renita | —N/a |
| Italian | 1950 | 2002 | 2007 | 2015 | Giuliana Maroni (speaking) | Monica Ward | Monica Ward (speaking) | Letizia Ciampa (speaking) |
| Italian | 1950 | 2002 | 2007 | 2015 | Deddi Savagnone (singing) | Monica Ward | Monica Ward (speaking) | Letizia Ciampa (speaking) |
| Italian | 1967 | 2002 | 2007 | 2015 | Fiorella Betti (speaking) | Monica Ward | Rossella Ruini (singing) | |
| Italian | 1967 | 2002 | 2007 | 2015 | Maria Cristina Brancucci (singing) | Monica Ward | Rossella Ruini (singing) | |
| Japanese | 1961 | 2002 | 2007 | 2015 | 富沢志満 (Tomizawa Shima) (speaking) | 鈴木より子 (Suzuki Yoriko) | | 高畑充希 (Takahata Mitsuki) |
| Japanese | 1961 | 2002 | 2007 | 2015 | 浜田尚子 (Hamada Naoko) (singing) | 鈴木より子 (Suzuki Yoriko) | | 高畑充希 (Takahata Mitsuki) |
| Japanese | 1992 | 2002 | 2007 | 2015 | 鈴木より子 (Suzuki Yoriko) | 鈴木より子 (Suzuki Yoriko) | | 高畑充希 (Takahata Mitsuki) |
| Kazakh | 2015 | 2016 | 2016 | 2015 | Айнұр Бермұхамбетова (Ainūr Bermūhambetova) | —N/a | | Шехназа Қызыханова (Şehnaza Qyzyhanova) |
| Korean | 1998 | 2002 | 2007 | 2015 | 서혜정 (Seo Hye-jeong) (speaking) | 서혜정 (Seo Hye-jeong) | 서혜정 (Seo Hye-jeong) (speaking) | 박지윤 (Park Ji-yoon) |
| Korean | 1998 | 2002 | 2007 | 2015 | 이미라 (Lee Mi-ra) (singing) | 서혜정 (Seo Hye-jeong) | 고은선 Go Eun-seon (singing) | 박지윤 (Park Ji-yoon) |
| Malay | 2013 | —N/a | | Not dubbed | Nurul Izzati binti Saad | —N/a | | Not dubbed |
| Marathi | Not dubbed | | 2015 | Not dubbed | Not dubbed | | केतकी माटेगावकर (Ketaki Mategaonkar) | Not dubbed |
| Norwegian | 1992 | 2002 | 2007 | 2015 | Edle Stray Pedersen | Marian Aas Hansen | | Mathilde Jakobsen Skarpsno |
| Polish | 1961 | 2002 | 2007 | 2015 | Maria Ciesielska (speaking) | Katarzyna Tatarak | Katarzyna Tatarak (speaking) | Aleksandra Radwan |
| Polish | 1961 | 2002 | 2007 | 2015 | Irena Santor (singing) | Katarzyna Tatarak | Katarzyna Tatarak (speaking) | Aleksandra Radwan |
| Polish | 2012 | 2002 | 2007 | 2015 | Angelika Kurowska (speaking) | Katarzyna Tatarak | Joanna Węgrzynowska (singing) | Aleksandra Radwan |
| Polish | 2012 | 2002 | 2007 | 2015 | Weronika Bochat-Piotrowska (singing) | Katarzyna Tatarak | Joanna Węgrzynowska (singing) | Aleksandra Radwan |
| Portuguese (Brazil) | 1951 | 2002 | 2007 | 2015 | Simone de Moraes | Fernanda Fernandes | Fernanda Fernandes (speaking) | Natali Pazete |
| Portuguese (Brazil) | 1951 | 2002 | 2007 | 2015 | Simone de Moraes | Fernanda Fernandes | Itauana Ciribelli (singing) | Natali Pazete |
| Portuguese (Portugal) | 2005 | 2002 | 2007 | 2015 | Sandra de Castro | Rute Pimenta | Sandra de Castro | Bárbara Lourenço |
| Romanian | 2010 | 2011 | 2011 | 2015 | Carmen Palcu (speaking) | Carmen Palcu | Carmen Palcu (speaking) | Anca Iliese |
| Romanian | 2010 | 2011 | 2011 | 2015 | Mediana Vlad (singing) | Carmen Palcu | Mediana Vlad (singing) | Anca Iliese |
| Russian | 2005 | 2002 | 2007 | 2015 | Татьяна Родионова (Tat'yana Rodionova) (speaking) | Анжелика Неволина (Anzhelika Nevolina) | Татьяна Родионова (Tat'yana Rodionova) (speaking) | Анна Слынько (Anna Slyn'ko) |
| Russian | 2005 | 2002 | 2007 | 2015 | Елена Галицкая (Yelena Galitskaya) (singing) | Анжелика Неволина (Anzhelika Nevolina) | Елена Галицкая (Yelena Galitskaya) (singing) | Анна Слынько (Anna Slyn'ko) |
| Serbian | 2012 | Not dubbed | | | Јелена Петровић (Jelena Petrović) (speaking) | Not dubbed | | |
| Serbian | 2012 | Not dubbed | | | Ирина Зорић (Irina Zorić) (singing) | Not dubbed | | |
| Slovak | 1970 | 2012 | 2012 | 2015 | Darina Chmúrová (speaking) | Monika Hilmerová | | Bianka Bucková |
| Slovak | 1970 | 2012 | 2012 | 2015 | B. Čupková (singing) | Monika Hilmerová | | Bianka Bucková |
| Slovak | 2012 | 2012 | 2012 | 2015 | Monika Hilmerová | Monika Hilmerová | | Bianka Bucková |
| Spanish (Latin America) | 1950 | 2002 | 2007 | 2015 | Evangelina Elizondo | Natalia Sosa | | Annie Rojas |
| Spanish (Latin America) | 1997 | 2002 | 2007 | 2015 | Natalia Sosa | Natalia Sosa | | Annie Rojas |
| Spanish (Spain) | 1997 | 2002 | 2007 | 2015 | Yolanda Mateos (speaking) | Yolanda Mateos | Yolanda Mateos (speaking) | María Blanco |
| Spanish (Spain) | 1997 | 2002 | 2007 | 2015 | Cani González (singing) | Yolanda Mateos | Cani González (singing) | María Blanco |
| Swedish | 1950 | 2002 | 2007 | 2015 | Tatjana Angelini | Lizette Pålsson | | Jasmine Heikura |
| Swedish | 1967 | 2002 | 2007 | 2015 | Alice Babs | Lizette Pålsson | | Jasmine Heikura |
| Thai | Not dubbed | 2002 | 2007 | 2015 | Not dubbed | อรวรรณ เย็นพูนสุข (Orawan Yenphunsuk) | | กฤติยา วุฒิหิรัญปรีดา (Krittiya Wutthihiranprida) |
| Turkish | 2003 | 2012 | 2007 | 2015 | Banu Kuday (speaking) | Aysun Topar | Banu Kuday (speaking) | Elif Atakan |
| Turkish | 2003 | 2012 | 2007 | 2015 | Tülay Uyar (speaking) | Aysun Topar | Tülay Uyar (speaking) | Elif Atakan |
| Ukrainian | 2012 | 2018 | 2018 | 2015 | Вікторія Івасишина (Viktoriia Ivasyshyna) | Єлизавета Мастаєва (Elyzaveta Mastaieva) | | —N/a |
| Vietnamese | 2019 | Not dubbed | | 2019 | Nguyễn Duyên Quỳnh | Not dubbed | | Nguyễn Duyên Quỳnh |

== Characteristics ==
Cinderella is a young woman with medium-length dusty-blonde hair, blue eyes and fair complexion. After her father dies, she is forced into servitude in her own home and is tormented by her evil stepmother, Lady Tremaine, and stepsister duo, Drizella and Anastasia. Lady Tremaine's hatred stems from the fact that Cinderella is more beautiful than her own daughters. Despite this, she maintains hope through her dreams and remains a kind, gentle and sweet person. She has faith that someday her dreams of happiness will come true and her kindness will be repaid. Cinderella is shown to have a down-to-earth attitude, but she is also a daydreamer. For example, in "Sing Sweet Nightingale", she becomes distracted with the bubbles, allowing Lucifer to smudge the floor she was cleaning. Also, after hearing that the Grand Duke is traveling the kingdom with the missing slipper, she dreamily dances back to the attic humming the song she heard at the ball. She is also shown to have a sarcastic side and a sharp wit.

With the help of her animal friends, she fixes up an old party dress of her mother's so she can attend a royal ball. However, when her evil stepsisters brutally tear the dress apart, she is heartbroken and fears that her dreams will never come true until her Fairy Godmother appears, restoring Cinderella's hope by transforming her torn homemade dress into her now-iconic sparkling silver ball gown with a glittering and crystalline puffy bustle, a delicate laced white petticoat and puffy cap sleeves. Her hair is worn up in a French twist supported by a silver headband with diamond earrings, a black choker, silver evening gloves and glass slippers.

Her look was probably inspired by 1950s French haute couture, while her torn dress is inspired by Salvador Dalì and Elsa Schiaparelli's Tear dress.

As a servant, she wears her hair down in a ponytail, held in place with a light blue ribbon, a white scarf and wears a brown dress with light blue sleeves, a white apron and black ballet flats.

== Appearances ==
=== Cinderella ===
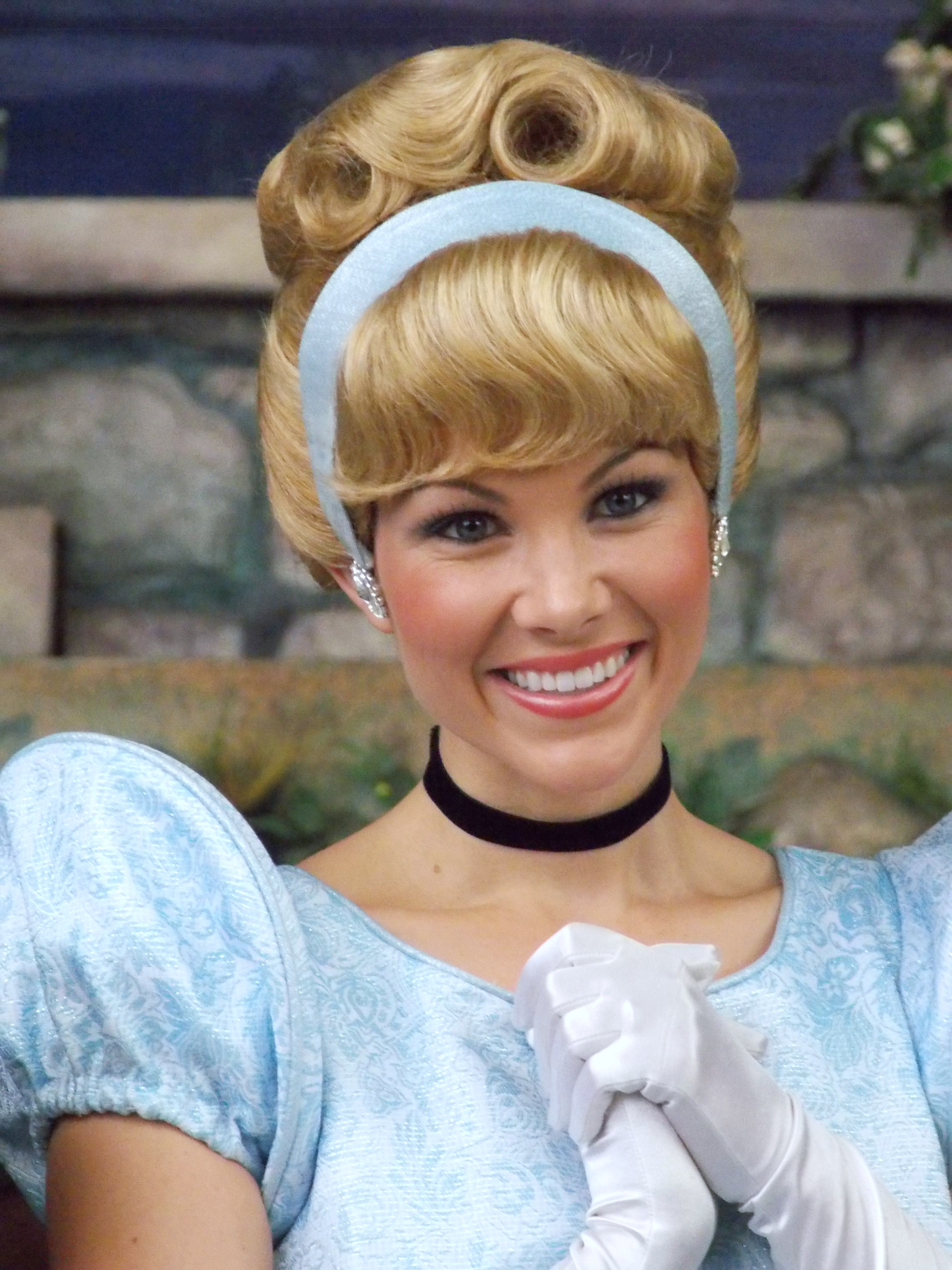
A cast member portrays Cinderella at Disneyland.

At the start of the film, the titular character Cinderella is working as a scullery maid in her own home for her stepfamily, the Tremaines. She is close friends with the animals around the home; specifically, the birds, the mice who also live in the manor house, including Gus and Jaq, her pet dog Bruno and her father's horse Major.

She prepares breakfast for the animals and for her stepfamily before beginning her regular chores. When the invitation for the ball arrives, Cinderella wants to attend. Her stepmother tells her she may only go if she finishes her chores and find something suitable to wear. Cinderella decides to wear her deceased mother's old party dress and hopes to fix it to make it more modern, but before she can do so, her stepfamily calls her downstairs to do constant chores to prevent her from attending the ball. Meanwhile, the mice and birds decide to surprise Cinderella by fixing the dress themselves. When they see Cinderella's stepsisters throwing down their old sash and beads, Jaq and Gus quietly retrieve them. Using the discarded items, the animals successfully fix the dress. By the time a carriage arrives to take the family to the ball that night, Cinderella has finished all her work but is despondent over having no time to fix the dress for the ball. She is overjoyed when her friends present her with the fixed dress. Cinderella hurries downstairs to join her stepfamily to go to the ball, but her stepsisters recognize their discarded items and accuse her of stealing their sash and beads. They tear the dress to shreds, leaving Cinderella behind, and she runs out to the garden, crying.

As she sobs over a stone bench, her Fairy Godmother appears to make her dreams come true and bestows her a beautiful silver gown and glass slippers. Before Cinderella leaves, her godmother warns her that the spell will be broken at midnight. At the ball, Cinderella dances with Prince Charming and they immediately fall in love with each other. As twelve o'clock approaches, she hurries to leave, hoping to prevent the spell from breaking at the ball, which could cause her to get caught by her stepmfamily. In her haste, she loses one of her glass slippers on the staircase but fails to retrieve it in time. Cinderella hurries into her coach as it prepares to leave. Soon, the spell breaks and Cinderella's dress reverts to its ruined state. Reminiscing her dance with the prince, Cinderella thanks her godmother for her help.

The next day, the prince announces he will marry the maiden whose foot fits into the glass slipper. Lady Tremaine hears Cinderella humming the same song that had played at the ball and figures out Cinderella was the girl Prince Charming fell in love with. Cinderella is locked in the tower by her stepmother, who refuses to let her have the opportunity to try on the slipper, but her animal friends help her escape. She hurries downstairs to try on the glass slipper. Knowing the slipper will fit her, Lady Tremaine intentionally causes the footman to trip and shatter the slipper. However, Cinderella reveals that she has kept the other slipper. She tries it on, and it fits perfectly. She and the Prince are married soon after.

=== Cinderella II: Dreams Come True ===
Gus and Jaq, with help of the other mice, and the Fairy Godmother, set off to make a new book to narrate what happens after the ending of the previous story by stringing three segments of stories together, resulting in three individual stories: "Aim to Please", "Tall Tail", and "An Uncommon Romance". In the first story, Cinderella and Prince Charming return home and a party begins shortly afterward. In the second story, "Tall Tail", Cinderella works on planning to build up a festival. The mouse named Jaq in the previous film has become a human named Sir Hugh. And in the third story, "An Uncommon Romance", Cinderella helps her younger stepsister Anastasia reconcile with the baker, even though her stepmother Lady Tremaine has forbidden it. Near the end of the film, she reads the book that the mice made for her.

=== Cinderella III: A Twist in Time ===
In Cinderella III: A Twist in Time, Cinderella's hard-working ethics, optimism, and devotion are put to the test, when she is magically stripped away from her "happily ever after" by a vengeful and then magically-empowered Tremaine and is forced to jump into physical action to restore her happy life and relationship with Prince Charming. During these events, Cinderella is shown to be cunning, tactical, persistent, and a fierce rival to those who oppress her. With no magic, being forced to rely solely on her intelligence and fearlessness, Cinderella is able to defeat her stepmother, repair her relationship with a reformed Anastasia and retain her much-deserved life of happiness, proving both her independence and strong will.

=== 2015 film ===
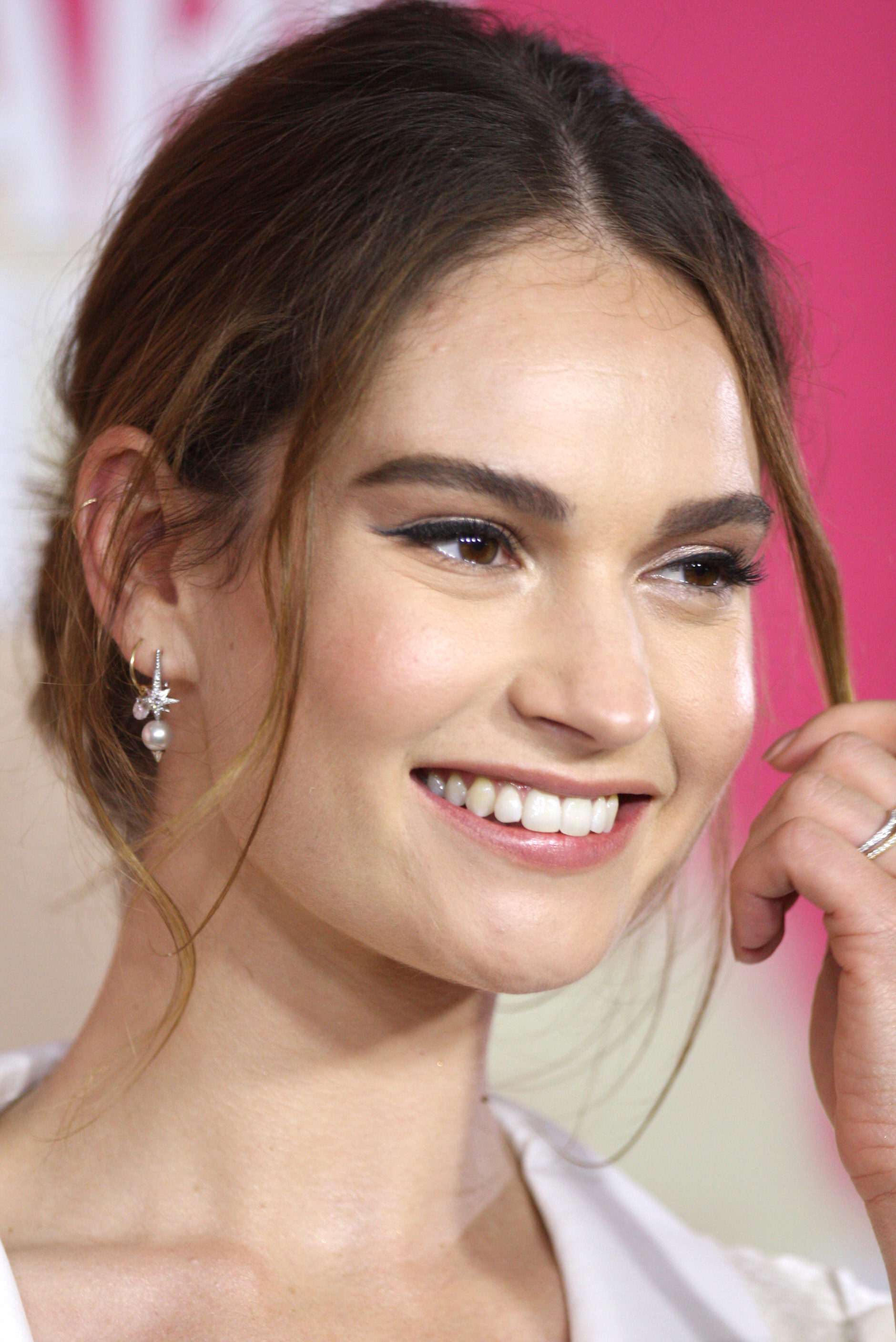
English actress Lily James played Cinderella in the 2015 film.

Lily James portrays the character, named Ella, in Disney's 2015 live-action version of Cinderella. Like in the original film, her father remarries after the death of her mother but after he dies as well, she then becomes the horribly mistreated servant of her stepmother Lady Tremaine and her two stepsisters, Anastasia and Drisella. They give her the nickname "Cinderella" when, one morning, she wakes up with soot on her face after sleeping near the fireplace the previous night. Unlike the original film, however, she meets the Prince (named Kit) before the ball while out in the forest. She is also shown to be more assertive when she actually stands up to her stepmother in the film's final act; Lady Tremaine attempts to blackmail Ella by only agreeing to let her try on the glass slipper if Ella will make her head of the royal household and provide suitable husbands for her stepsisters, but Ella rejects this idea, refusing to give Lady Tremaine power over Kit after the way she ruined Ella's life. After Kit manages to find Ella and make her his wife, Ella still forgives Lady Tremaine for her cruelty. Critics praised James for her performance in the film. (Note: Attributed to multiple references:)

== In other media ==
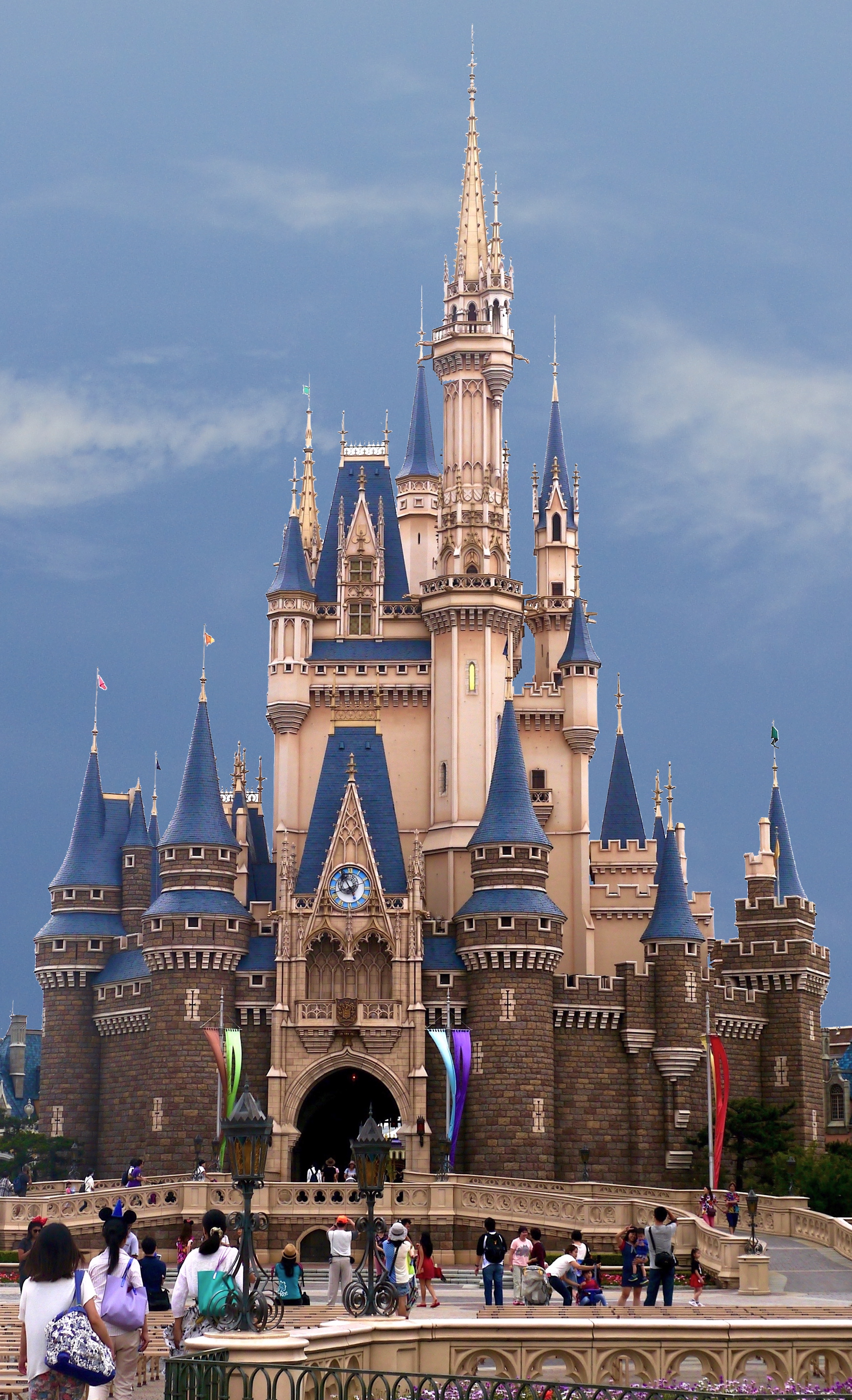
Cinderella Castle at Tokyo Disneyland.

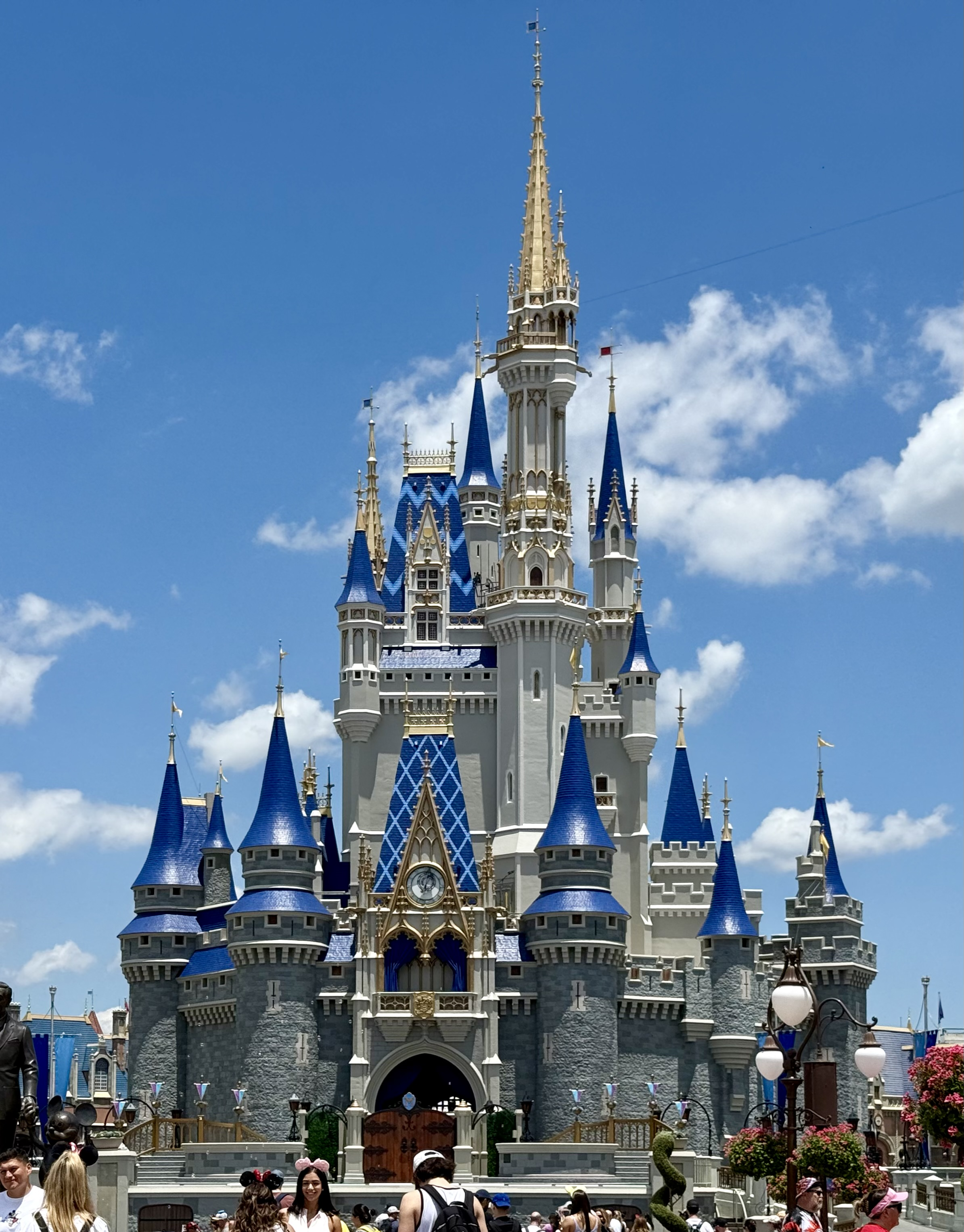
Cinderella Castle at Walt Disney World.

Cinderella is one of the official members of the Disney Princess franchise, appearing in several related video games, albums and other merchandise. Cinderella appears as one of the Disney Princesses in the manga, Kilala Princess.

The Cinderella Castle is an attraction at Walt Disney World's Magic Kingdom and Tokyo Disneyland at the Tokyo Disney Resort. Both serve as globally recognized icons for their respective theme parks. Cinderella and the other Disney Princesses have a meet and greet attraction called Princess Fairytale Hall at the Magic Kingdom.

In the season six episodes of the sitcom series Full House known as The House Meets The Mouse Parts 1 & 2, Cinderella makes cameo appearances in both Parts 1 & 2.

Cinderella is also voiced by the American voice-actress Patricia Parris in Disney's read-along version of Cinderella, and Susan Stevens Logan, who provided the studio singing voice of Cinderella, also voiced her in various Disney albums and projects. Kate Higgins, Jennifer Paz, and Juliana Hansen for The Legacy Collection: Cinderella.

Cinderella appeared as a recurring guest character in House of Mouse, and has minor appearances its films Mickey's Magical Christmas: Snowed in at the House of Mouse and Mickey's House of Villains. Cinderella also appears alongside other Disney Princesses in the 2025 animated streaming television special Lego Disney Princess: Villains Unite.

Cinderella also appears in various Disney books published by Random House.

Jessy Schram played a version of the character in the television series Once Upon a Time and its spin-off Once Upon a Time in Wonderland, taking elements of the Disney version of the character. Dania Ramirez portrays another version of the character in season 7 as a main character with a different storyline.

Cinderella appears in the Sofia the First pilot movie Sofia the First: Once Upon a Princess, where she helps Sofia make friends with Amber, her stepsister. It was announced in April 2026 that Cinderella will appear in the sequel series to Sofia the First, entitled Sofia the First: Royal Magic, with Cinderella providing "wisdom and guidance" with the protagonist, Sofia.

In the television series Mickey Mouse, Cinderella appears in the episode "Le Croissant de Triomphe", where while Mickey hurries and flies through Paris, he accidentally lands in a castle where Prince Charming tries to fit the crystal slipper into Cinderella's foot. She was still dressed in her regular maid clothes. At that time, Mickey accidentally passes in his motorcycle and breaks the glass slipper.

Cinderella, alongside other Disney Princesses, appeared in the film Ralph Breaks the Internet, as was announced at the 2017 D23 Expo.

In the Descendants franchise, Cinderella and Prince Charming have a son named Chad, who appears in the first three films of the franchise, and a daughter named Chloe, who appears in the fourth and fifth films. Cinderella has cameo appearances in the first film during Prince Ben's coronation, and in Descendants 2 during the Cotillion, in both cases portrayed by uncredited actresses. She later appears in a major role in the fourth film, Descendants: The Rise of Red, being portrayed by Brandy Norwood (who previously also portrayed a version of Cinderella in the 1997 television film Rodgers & Hammerstein's Cinderella), while Morgan Dudley plays a young "Ella". Norwood reprises the role in the fifth film, Descendants: Wicked Wonderland.

Cinderella appears in the short film Once Upon a Studio. She comes down the stairs with Prince Charming when he loses his shoe on the stairs and Prince Eric's dog grabs the shoe. She and charming chase after it and they are both seen in the group photo.

=== Video games ===
In the Kingdom Hearts series, Cinderella is depicted as a Princess of Heart, a group of maidens who possess no darkness in their hearts and can open the door to Kingdom Hearts, the source of all hearts. In Kingdom Hearts (2002), Cinderella is captured by Maleficent, who destroyed her home world, the Castle of Dreams. Sora rescues Cinderella, as well as the other Princesses, and she returns home. Cinderella also appears in the prequel Kingdom Hearts Birth by Sleep (2010), where she meets Ventus, Aqua, and Terra.

Cinderella appears in the Nintendo 3DS game Disney Magical World. Cinderella's world is one of the four Disney movie worlds accessible to the player in this game, and many characters and items related to the movie appear. Additionally, the player has the option of attending balls at Cinderella's castle. Cinderella also appears in Disney Magical World 2, though she now hosts balls at the Magic Castle.

Cinderella is a playable character in the world builder video game Disney Magic Kingdoms.

She also appears in Disney Princess: My Fairytale Adventure, Disney Princess: Enchanted Journey, Kinect: Disneyland Adventures, Cookie Run: Kingdom, Disney's Princess Fashion Boutique, Disney Princess: Cinderella's Castle Designer, Disney Dreamlight Valley, and Disney Mirrorverse.

== Reception and legacy ==
=== Critical response ===
Although the film has garnered critical acclaim, Cinderella herself has attracted mostly mixed reviews in modern times. Variety disliked the character, describing her as "colorless." Calling her an "oppressed drudge," Empire panned Cinderella, describing both her and Prince Charming as "bland and colourless characters - particularly when compared to Beauty and her Beast." The New York Times' Bosley Crowther similarly wrote, "The beautiful Cinderella has a voluptuous face and form—not to mention an eager disposition—to compare with Al Capp's Daisy Mae." However, criticizing her role and personality, Bosely opined, "As a consequence, the situation in which they are mutually involved have the constraint and immobility of panel-expressed episodes. When Mr. Disney tries to make them behave like human beings, they're banal."

Film4 negatively described Cinderella as "one-dimensional." Criticizing her design, Roger Ebert of the Chicago Sun-Times wrote, "If there is an obvious difference between Cinderella and such predecessors as Pinocchio and Snow White, it's in the general smoothing-out of the character's appearances," concluding, "Snow White herself looked fairly bland, but the other characters in the first decade of Disney animation had a lot of personality in their faces. They were allowed to look odd. Cinderella seems to come right out of its time, the bland postwar 1950s," likening the character's flawless design to that of a "Draw Me girl." Concerned about the negative effects Cinderella's passivity could possibly induce upon children, Nell Minow of Common Sense Media expressed, "Cinderella is the quintessential passive heroine rescued by a male character ... so discussions about her meekness might be in order." About.com's Laurie Boeder simply described Cinderella as "blah." Desi Jedeikin of Smosh included the character in the website's "8 Fictional Characters That Are Horrible Role Models For Girls" list, explaining, "I'm like so happy that Cinderella found true love with a rich stranger who rescued her from her horrible life. But wouldn't it have been better if she did it for herself?" Additionally, critics have also expressed favoritism towards Cinderella's supporting cast of animal characters, particularly the comic interaction and dynamic between her pet mice Jaq and Gus and her stepfamily's pet cat Lucifer, often preferring them to Cinderella herself while noting ways in which the heroine is constantly being "upstaged."

Among Cinderella's positive reviews, Michael Scheinfeld of TV Guide drew similarities between the character and Belle from Beauty and the Beast (1991), writing, Cinderella holds up better because the heroine seems timeless in her courage and resourcefulness, a closer cousin to Belle in Disney's Beauty and the Beast than to other fairy tale protagonists." Hailing Cinderella as "the most famous and beloved princess of all time," HowStuffWorks' Vicki Arkoff defended the character, writing, "highly sympathetic Cinderella is endlessly kind, patient, hard-working, and unassuming -- no matter how cruelly she is treated by her exaggerated, cartoonish foes." Arkoff elaborated, "Unlike Disney's passive, naive Snow White, Disney's Cinderella is a princess who decides to take charge and change her life for the better, rather than just wait for things to happen that might solve her problem." Review aggregator Rotten Tomatoes' general consensus reads that, in addition to "The rich colors, sweet songs, adorable mice," the "endearing (if suffering) heroine make[s] Cinderella a nostalgically lovely charmer." Jennifer Lee, Disney's chief creative officer, said in 2023 that the character helped her in times being bullied in middle school recalling, "I had a very, very difficult three years, and I would come home and put Cinderella on when I would do homework, because to me, it seemed like she was so mistreated and she held on to herself" while also adding, "For anyone who's gone through that, it's hard. You believe the noise, and she never did."

Woods herself has collected widespread acclaim for her performance. Variety wrote, "Ilene Woods, as Cinderella's voice, uses a sweet soprano." Craig Butler of AllMovie opined, "Ilene Woods makes a marvelous Cinderella, her voice a combination of girlishness and sophistication; she also possesses a serenity and assurance which makes one feel she is more in control of her life than might be guessed by her surroundings." At the time of Woods' death, animation critic and historian Charles Solomon told the Los Angeles Times, "one of the things about her performance is the warmth she gave the character. As soon as she began to speak, her voice meshed with Marc Davis' animation to create a heroine you liked instantly."

=== Accolades ===
Cinderella has since become one of the most famous, recognizable and popular princesses, both fictional and non-fictional, of all-time. According to the San Antonio Express-News, Cinderella is one of the ten most famous princesses of all-time. In 2013, Cosmopolitan ranked the character the ninth greatest Disney Princess.

In 2003, Woods received a Disney Legends award for her role as the voice of Cinderella. In 2010, she died at the age of 81 of Alzheimer's disease. In an interview with Starlog in 2006 Woods said, "I love the idea that after I'm gone, children will still be hearing my voice [as Cinderella]." In 2013, Film School Rejects recognized Woods as one of "7 No-Name Actors Who Had Iconic Roles", ranking the actress first and writing, "Woods ... really set the bar high, as she managed to audition for the part of Cinderella without even realize she had done it."

=== Cultural impact ===
Culturally, Cinderella has had a profound influence on the fashion industry. According to Sarah Osman of Young Hollywood, "Cinderella's gown in this film is so iconic that it's become canon that Cinderella wears a light blue dress to the ball." To coincide with the release of the diamond edition of Cinderella in 2012, French footwear designer Christian Louboutin created and designed a contemporary rendition of the character's iconic glass slipper. In an interview with The Express Tribune, Louboutin said that Cinderella is "not only an iconic character when it comes to beauty, grace and fairytale love, but also shoes." The shoes are described as "made of delicate lace [instead of glass] to give them a look of transparency, and adorned with butterfly designs at the vamp and atop the Swarovski-crystal covered heel," completed by Louboutin's signature red soles. Only twenty copies of the shoes were manufactured. In 2014, Entertainment Weekly ranked Cinderella tenth in its article "Disney Princesses: Ranking Their Hairdos -- and Don'ts!", writing, "The lowly maid's typically rage-inducing bangs somehow develop an almost stately character once the rest of her follicular baggage has been swept into an updo closely resembling a perky butt."

At the 86th Academy Awards in 2014, Kenyan actress and Best Supporting Actress recipient Lupita Nyong'o donned "a light blue Prada gown." Subsequently, the media responded by drawing similarities between Nyong'o's dress and Cinderella's ballgown. Cosmopolitan wrote that Nyong'o "took a cue from Disney with a blue iridescent gown and matching headband a la Cinderella," while the Daily News similarly opined "channeled another Disney princess for her Oscars gown." Acknowledging the comparisons, Nyong'o's stylist Micaela Erlanger described the actress' appearance as "Lupita + Cinderella=Lupitarella." Additionally, several critics have deemed Nyong'o's success a "Cinderella story." According to MTV, several other Academy Award attendants wore similar outfits that were reminiscent of Disney characters in addition to Nyong'o.

Under current US copyright law, Disney's version of Cinderella is due to enter the US public domain in 2045. (Note: See USC Title 17, Chapter 3, § 304(b)) However, this will only apply to her appearance and characters that were in the 1950 film. Later versions of her appearance may persist under copyright until the works they were introduced in enter the US public domain themselves.

==== Makeover sequence ====
Cinderella's dress transformation as seen in the 1950 film.

The iconic "Bibbidi-Bobbidi-Boo" musical sequence in which Cinderella's Fairy Godmother magically transforms the character's tattered rags into a beautiful ball gown has garnered widespread critical acclaim, receiving positive reviews, accolades and recognition from several entertainment critics. AllMovie described the sequence as "splendidly done," while HitFix deemed it the film's best moment. According to Disney.com, the transformation of Cinderella's dress into a ballgown remains a common favorite and "one of the most iconic pieces of Disney animation because of what it means for the titular character." StyleCaster wrote that the scene is responsible for introducing the common "movie makeover," writing, "Ever since Cinderella ditched those rags and threw on a ball gown and a pair of glass slippers, movie audiences have fallen for the beloved transformation storyline." Featuring Cinderella in its list of "13 movie makeovers that still totally rock our socks off", Glamour summarized the scene's role in the film as "The movie makeover that sees a merry band of rodents help Cindera[sic]lla to make the perfect dress, eventually go to the ball and ultimately win the heart of a prince." Oprah.com also included Cinderella in its "Favorite Movie Makeovers" list, accrediting the film and Disney with "first introducing us to the head-to-toe makeover," concluding, " Unrealistic expectations are born."

Likewise, both the sequence and Cinderella's magical transformation have been featured on several "best movie makeover" countdown lists. On Stylist's list of the "50 Best Movie Makeovers", Cinderella placed first, with the magazine labeling her the "Recipient of the original makeover." Additionally, Stylist coined the list's other candidates "Cinematic Cinderellas," alluding to the character's legacy. InStyle ranked Cinderella second on its list of "The Best Movie Makeovers", writing, "Cinderella's fairy tale transformation is the stuff that many a little girl's real-life makeover dreams are made of." Hailing it as "[The] makeover of makeovers" and "the movie that started it all," The Independent Florida Alligator ranked Cinderella first in its list of "The best of movie makeovers". Style Blazer also ranked Cinderella second on its list of the "Top 11 Favorite Makeover Movies of All Time", concluding, "Cinderella and her pauper to princess makeover have already gone down in movie history as one of the best transformations." Calling Cinderella the "Original Fairy Godmother ... makeover," Total Beauty ranked the character fifth in its article "11 Best Movie Makeovers".
