= Rosica Petkova =

Bulgarian composer (born 1947)

Rosica Petkova (Dimitrova) (Bulgarian: Росица Петкова (Димитрова)) (born 18 February 1947) is a Bulgarian composer. The daughter of Dimitar Petkov, she was born in Plovdiv, Bulgaria, and studied composition at the Prague Academy of Music with Emil Hlobil and at the Sofia State Academy with Alexander Raichev and Dimitar Tapkoff, where she graduated in 1981.

Petkova worked as editor of the "Music Bandstand" Library at the Center for Amateur Art from 1981 to 1991. After 1991, she went to work as a freelance composer and teacher. She has composed choral works, solovi, chamber works, children's songs and arrangements of folk songs. She has been active in developing music opportunities in Bulgaria, including choral festivals and national awards competitions for children.

== Works ==
Selected works include: Choral-orchestral:

- Baptism in Pliska bass, reader, choir and orchestra. Cantata (1977)

For symphony orchestra:

- Scherzo for flute and piano (1974)
- Concerts for Clarinet and Orchestra (1981)

For voice and string orchestra:

- Cherries
- Still Life (1980) lyrics by Dimitar Metodiev

Chamber music:

- Sonata for flute and piano (1976)

Piano: Plays, Variations, Etudes (1976–79)

Engaged Songs:

- Trud our blessed, with D. Damianov.

Children's songs:

- "Riddles" lyrics by Leda Mileva (1988)
- "Bubble" lyrics by Leda Mileva (1988)
- "Our friend is laughter" lyrics by Asen Bosev
- "Two pacifiers"
