= 1999 IAAF World Indoor Championships – Women's triple jump =

The women's triple jump event at the 1999 IAAF World Indoor Championships was held on March 7.

== Results ==
Rank	Athlete	Nationality	#1	#2	#3	#4	#5	#6	Result	Notes
1st place, gold medalist(s)	Ashia Hansen	Great Britain	15.02	x	x	x	14.86	14.67	15.02	WL
2nd place, silver medalist(s)	Iva Prandzheva	Bulgaria	14.45	14.75	14.42	14.94	14.68	14.92	14.94	NR
3rd place, bronze medalist(s)	Šárka Kašpárková	Czech Republic	14.83	14.87	x	x	14.80	14.46	14.87	NR
4	Teresa Marinova	Bulgaria	x	14.18	14.76	14.76	14.71	x	14.76	PB
5	Paraskevi Tsiamita	Greece	14.63	x	x	12.17	14.51	14.24	14.63	NR
6	Yelena Lebedenko	Russia	14.59	14.07	x	14.02	x	12.17	14.59	
7	Yamilé Aldama	Cuba	x	13.81	14.13	14.12	14.47	13.99	14.47	AR
8	Yelena Donkina	Russia	14.30	13.72	14.12	x	x	14.15	14.30	
9	Rodica Mateescu	Romania	14.04	x	13.90				14.04	SB
10	Olena Hovorova	Ukraine	x	13.98	13.76				13.98	
11	Miao Chunqing	China	13.66	13.71	13.89				13.89	
12	Adelina Gavrilă	Romania	13.37	11.59	13.47				13.47	
13	Maho Hanaoka	Japan	12.93	12.90	12.54				12.93	
	Ren Ruiping	China	x	x	x				NM	
	Olga Vasdeki	Greece							DNS	
