= Alexander Raichev =

Bulgarian music educator and composer (1922–2003)

Alexander Raichev (Bulgarian: Александър Райчев) (11 April 1922 – 28 October 2003) was a Bulgarian music educator and composer.

== Biography ==
Raichev was born in Lom, Bulgaria, and studied with Pancho Vladigerov at the State Musical Academy in Sofia where he graduated in 1947. He then studied with Zoltán Kodály and Janos Ferencsik at the Budapest Conservatory from 1949-50. After completing his studies, he taught at the Bulgarian State Conservatory, serving as Rector from 1970 to 1978. Notable students include Rosica Petkova.

In 1969 Vasheto prisatvie (Your Presence) was the earliest Bulgarian radio opera to be broadcast.

== Selected works ==
- 1937: Suite for chamber orchestra
- 1943: Largo and Scherzo for string orchestra
- 1945: Symphonic Suite for orchestra
- 1947: Piano Concerto (lost)
- 1949–50: Symphony No.1: Symphony/Cantata “He Shall Not Die” for chorus and orchestra
- 1949–50 “Pioneers Suite” for female chorus and orchestra
- 1953: Ballet “Haidouk Song” (and two Ballet Suites, 1954 and 1955)
- 1953 Oratorio “Dimitrov still Lives” for soloist, narrator, male chorus and orchestra
- 1954: Oratorio “Friendship” for bass, chorus and orchestra
- 1954: Sonata-Poem for Violin and Orchestra
- 1955: Suite for chamber orchestra
- 1958: Symphony No.2 “The New Prometheus”
- 1962: Four Miniatures for string orchestra
- 1966: Symphony No.3 “Strivings”
- 1966 Overture “Bright Day”
- 1967: Oratorio “October 1950” for mezzo-soprano, baritone, chorus and orchestra
- 1968: Symphony No.4 for string orchestra
- 1970: Symphonic Glorification “Lenin Generations” for orchestra
- 1971: Overture “Bright Dawn”
- 1972: Symphony No.5 for chamber orchestra
- 1972: Symphonic Moments “Leipzig ‘33” for orchestra
- 1974: Academic Overture
- 1975: Festival Overture
- 1978: Ballet “The Fountain of the White-legged Woman” (and Ballet Suite)
- 1979: Cantata “Varna”
- 1979: Concerto for Orchestra
- 1983: Balkan Rhapsody for orchestra
- 1983: Concert March No.1 for wind orchestra
- 1984: March for wind orchestra
- 1985: Concert March No.2 for wind orchestra
- 1986: Jubilee Overture
- 1986: Overture “Eulogy”
- 1986: Ballad for the Unknown Soldier for bass and wind orchestra
- 1987: “Thoughts about the Master sketches” for string orchestra
- 1987: Overture “Levski” for wind orchestra
- 1988: Cantata “Shipka” for soloists, narrators, male chorus and orchestra
- 1989: Triptych for clarinet, piano, strings and percussion
- 1991: Oratorio “Kabile” for narrator, chorus and orchestra
- 1992: Romantic Concerto for Violin and Orchestra
- 1994: Symphony No.6 “Liturgical”
- 1995: Partita melancolica for string orchestra
- 1998: Symphonic Episodes for orchestra

Opera

- 1962: Slaveyat na Orkhideyata (The Nightingale of the Orchid) - (operetta, V. Bashev after P. Panchev), Sofia State Music - March 6, 1962
- 1965: Most (The Bridge) - (Bashev), Ruse Opera, October 2, 1965
- 1969: Vasheto prisastvie (Your Presence) - Radio Sofia, Sept. 5, 1969.
- 1980: Blagoevgrad Chamber Opera
- 1974: Trevoga (Anxiety) - (O. Orlinov, after O. Vassilev), Sofia National Opera, 1974
