= Clifford Clogg =

American sociologist, demographer, and statistician

Clifford C. Clogg
- Born: October 16, 1949; Oberlin, Ohio
- Died: May 7, 1995 (aged 45); Bellefonte, Pennsylvania
- Education: University of Chicago
- Known for: Contributions to population statistics, categorical data analysis, and latent class analysis
- Scientific career
- Fields: Sociology, demographics, statistics
- Workplaces: Pennsylvania State University
- Doctoral students: Eva Petkova

Clifford Collier Clogg (October 16, 1949 – May 7, 1995) was an American sociologist, demographer, and statistician. He is best known for his contributions to population statistics, categorical data analysis, and latent class analysis.

== Biography ==
Clogg was born in 1949 in Oberlin, Ohio. He earned a B.A. in sociology in 1971 from Ohio University, and continued his studies at the University of Chicago, where he earned an M.A. in sociology and an M.Sc. in statistics in 1974, and a Ph.D. in sociology in 1977. Starting in 1976 he served at the Pennsylvania State University faculty, rising to the rank of Distinguished Professor of Sociology and Professor of Statistics.

He served as an editor of several journals, including the Journal of the American Statistical Association, Demography, Sociological Methodology, and the Journal of Educational and Behavioral Statistics.

The Clifford C. Clogg Award of the Population Association of America, the Clifford Clogg Award of the Methodology Section of the American Sociological Association, and the Clifford C. Clogg Scholarship of the Inter-university Consortium for Political and Social Research are named in his honor.

== Selected publications ==
- Clogg, Clifford C. "Latent class models." Handbook of statistical modeling for the social and behavioral sciences. Springer US, 1995. 311–359.
- Clogg, Clifford C., Eva Petkova, and Adamantios Haritou. "Statistical methods for comparing regression coefficients between models." American Journal of Sociology (1995): 1261–1293.
- Clogg, Clifford C., and Leo A. Goodman. "Latent structure analysis of a set of multidimensional contingency tables." Journal of the American Statistical Association 79.388 (1984): 762–771.
- Clogg, Clifford C. "Some models for the analysis of association in multiway cross-classifications having ordered categories." Journal of the American Statistical Association 77.380 (1982): 803–815.
- Clogg, Clifford C., and Scott R. Eliason. "Some common problems in log-linear analysis." Sociological Methods & Research 16.1 (1987): 8-44.
- Clogg, Clifford C. "Latent structure models of mobility." American Journal of Sociology (1981): 836–868.
- Clogg, Clifford C. "Using association models in sociological research: Some examples." American Journal of Sociology (1982): 114–134.
