= Petrana Petkova =

Bulgarian runner (born 1972)

Personal information
- Full name: Petrana Histova-Petkova
- Born: September 20, 1972 (age 53) Razlog, Bulgaria

Sport
- Country: Bulgaria
- Sport: Athletics
- College team: Goshen College Maple Leafs
- Now coaching: Goshen College Maple Leafs
- Updated on 27 May 2013

Petrana Petkova (Bulgarian: Петрана Петкова) (born September 20, 1972 in Razlog), also known as Petrana Histova-Petkova (Bulgarian: Петрана Христова-Петкова), is a Bulgarian middle and long distance runner. She holds the Bulgarian record in 5000m indoor with 17:19.53, set on February 3, 2006 in Bloomington, USA.

Petkova earned sixteenth NAIA All American honors, while winning the 2007 Indoor 5K and 2007 Outdoor 10K National Championships.

In 2012, she started her first season as assistant coach at Goshen College in Goshen, Indiana. She was previously an assistant coach at Union College in Barbourville, Kentucky and is the current Fitness and conditioning coach for FC Indiana women's soccer team. In 2017 Petkova competing in Bikini Competition NPC Midwest Gladiator Championship-Chicago IL and NPC Northern Indiana Championship -South Bend IN, winning and two times national qualifier in her class.

http://contests.npcnewsonline.com/contests/2017/npc_midwest_gladiator_championships/petrana_petkova/

http://www.npcnorthernindiana.com/2014-Breakdown.html
