= Desislav Gunev =

Bulgarian sprinter

Desislav Gunev (born 21 January 1986 in Gabrovo) is a track and field sprint athlete who competes internationally for Bulgaria.

Gunev represented Bulgaria at the 2008 Summer Olympics in Beijing. He competed at the 100 metres sprint and placed 6th in his heat without advancing to the second round. He ran the distance in a time of 10.66 seconds. He also took part in the 200 metres individual, finishing sixth in his first round heat, with a time of 21.55 seconds, which was not enough to qualify for the second round.
