= Kristina Petkova =

Bulgarian politician (born 1991)

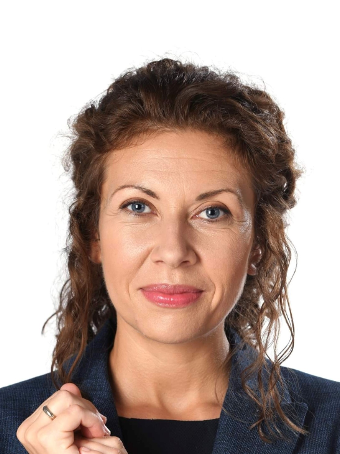
- Petkova in 2023

Member of the National Assembly
- Incumbent
- Assumed office 12 April 2023
- Constituency: 23rd MMC (2023–2024); 25th MMC (2024–present)

Personal details
- Born: 29 January 1991 (age 35)
- Party: Democrats for a Strong Bulgaria

Kristina Nikolaeva Petkova (Bulgarian: Кристина Николаева Петкова; born 29 January 1991) is a Bulgarian politician serving as a member of the National Assembly since 2023. She is a deputy chairwoman of Democrats for a Strong Bulgaria.
