= Avgustina-Kalina Petkova =

Bulgarian actress (born 1991)

- Августина-Калина Петкова
- Born: Avgustina-Kalina Plamen Petkova; 19 November 1991 (age 34); Pleven, Bulgaria
- Education: National Academy for Theatre and Film Arts (BA)
- Occupation: Actress
- Years active: 2011–present

Avgustina-Kalina Plamen Petkova (Bulgarian: Августина-Калина Пламен Петкова; born 19 November 1991) is a Bulgarian actress.

== Life and career ==
Petkova was born on 19 November 1991 in Pleven. In 2014, she graduated from the National Academy for Theatre and Film Arts with a degree in drama theatre.

She has performed on the stages of the Azaryan Theater, Stefan Kirov Drama Theatre in Sliven, Konstantin Velichkov Drama and Puppet Theater in Pazardzhik, the Sfumato Theatre and the Nikolai Binev Youth Theater.

Petkova is involved in the Bulgarian dubbing of films and series. Her voice roles including Penguins of Madagascar, Peter Rabbit, Spider-Man: Into the Spider-Verse, Ralph Breaks the Internet, Tom & Jerry, Raya and the Last Dragon, Sing 2, Turning Red, The Bad Guys and others.

== Filmography ==
=== Live-action ===
List of acting performances in series
Year	Title	Role	Notes
2021	Stolen Life	Raped Patient	

=== Voice acting ===
==== Films ====
List of dubbing performances in films
Year	Title	Role	Notes
2011	Winx Club 3D: Magical Adventure		
2013	Monsters University	Additional voices	
2013	Frozen	Additional voices	
2014	Penguins of Madagascar	Eva	
2015	The Snow Queen	Gerda	
2015	The Snow Queen 2	Gerda	
2015	Cinderella	Cinderella	
2015	Star Wars: The Force Awakens	Additional voices	
2016	Kung Fu Panda 3	Additional voices	
2016	Rogue One	Additional voices	
2017	The Snow Queen 3: Fire and Ice	Gerda	
2018	Peter Rabbit	Bea	
2018	Solo: A Star Wars Story	Additional voices	
2018	Spider-Man: Into the Spider-Verse	Gwen Stacy	
2018	Ralph Breaks the Internet	Shank	
2018	Mary Poppins Returns	Additional voices	
2019	The Snow Queen: Mirrorlands	Gerda	
2021	Tom & Jerry	Kayla Forester	
2021	Peter Rabbit 2: The Runaway	Bea	
2021	Raya and the Last Dragon	Naamari	
2021	Sing 2	Suki Lane	
2022	Turning Red	Lily	
2022	The Bad Guys	Diane Foxington	
