= Eva Petkova =

Bulgarian-American biostatistician

Eva Petkova is a Bulgarian-American biostatistician interested in the application of statistics to psychiatry, and known for her research on regression model comparison, brain imaging, and mental disorders. She is a professor of population health and of child and adolescent psychology at the New York University School of Medicine, and a research scientist at the Nathan Kline Institute for Psychiatric Research.

== Education and career ==
Petkova a bachelor's degree in mathematics in 1982, a master's degree in mathematics in 1984, and a Ph.D. in physics in 1987 from Sofia University in Bulgaria. She completed a second Ph.D. in 1992 in statistics, at Pennsylvania State University. Her statistics dissertation, General Procedures for Analysis of Collapsibility in Generalized Linear Models, was supervised by Clifford Clogg.

After postdoctoral research at Harvard University, she joined the Columbia University faculty in 1994, in biostatistics and psychiatry, and as director of biostatistics at the New York State Psychiatric Institute. She moved to New York University in 2006.

Petkova was one of the founders of the Annual Symposium on Statistics in Psychiatry, later renamed as the Thomas R. Ten Have Symposium on Statistics in Mental Health.

== Recognition ==
In 2014 Petkova was elected as a Fellow of the American Statistical Association "for significant research contributions to statistical methodology in mental health research; for dedicated leadership in advancing the use of statistical methods for the analysis of mental health data; and for devoted mentoring of students and medical researchers".
