= Dimitar Tapkoff =

Bulgarian musician, music educator and composer

Dimitar Tapkoff (12 July 1929 – 7 May 2011) was a Bulgarian musician, music educator and composer.

== Life and career ==
Dimitar Tapkoff was born in Sofia, Bulgaria, and studied composition with Bulgarian composer Marin Goleminov. After completing his studies, he worked with Bulgarian National Radio, Sofia National Opera, the Bulgarian Academy of Sciences, the Bulgarian State Academy of Music and the Ministry of Culture. In 1971 he became a professor of composition at the Academy of Music and Dance Art in Plovdiv. He also served as the director of the Sofia Music Weeks International Music Festival. His works have been performed internationally and recorded.

== Honors and awards ==
- First prize of the International Composer's Rostrum, Paris, 1976 for Peace Cantata

== Works ==
Tapkoff composes in a number of genres, including choral, instrumental and orchestral music. Selected works include:

- Peace Cantata, Microsymphony
- Variants for String Orchestra,
- Concertino for Bassoon and String Orchestra
- Sonata for Violoncello
- Sonata for Clarinet
