= Mitko Tsenov =

Bulgarian middle-distance runner

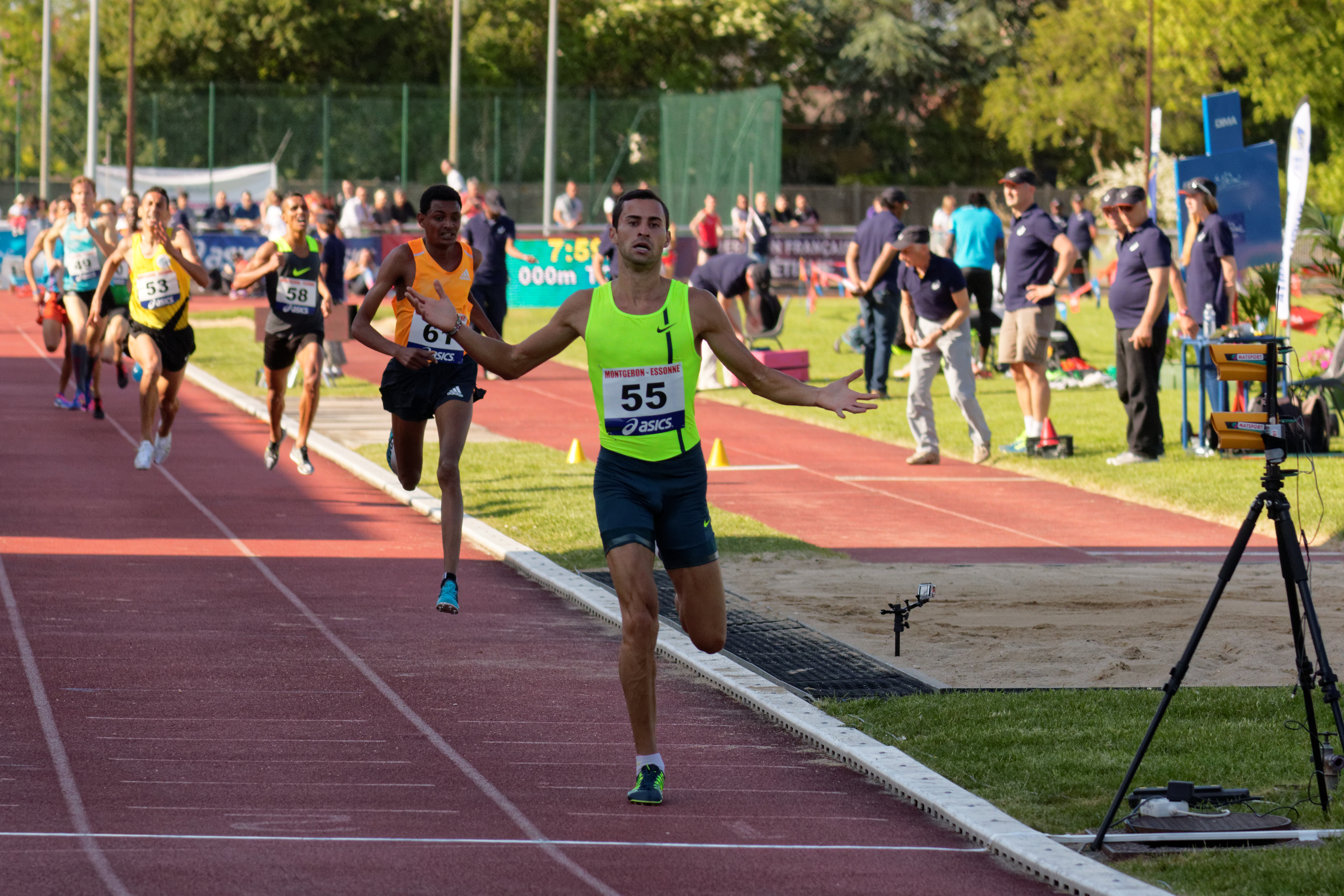
- Tsenov winning the 3000 meters at Montgeron 2015

Personal information
- Nationality: Bulgarian
- Born: June 13, 1993 (age 33) Mezdra, Bulgaria
- Height: 182 cm (6 ft 0 in)
- Weight: 64 kg (141 lb); 10 st)

Sport
- Sport: Track
- Event(s): 1500 metres, 3000 metres, 3000-m steeplechase

Achievements and titles
- Personal best(s): 1500m: 3:42.34; 3k steeple: 8:20.87
Medal record
Men's athletics
Representing Bulgaria
European Cross Country Championships
Silver medal – second place	2012 Szentendre	Junior men's 6K
- Updated on June 21, 2015

Mitko Tsenov (Bulgarian: Митко Ценов) (born 13 June 1993) is a Bulgarian middle-distance runner who specializes in various events. He represented Bulgaria at the 2013 World Championships in Athletics. As of 2014, Tsenov is the fastest Bulgarian to have ever run the 3000 metres steeplechase, breaking Mikhail Zhelev's national record on June 12, 2014.

== Running career ==
Tsenov made his first major international appearance at the 2011 IAAF World Cross Country Championships, where he placed 86th out of 106 finishers in the junior men's 8K race. At the 2012 World Junior Championships in Athletics, he competed in the men's 3000-metre steeplechase, where he narrowly missed qualification to the final round. At the 2012 European Cross Country Championships, he finished second overall in the junior men's race behind Poland's Szymon Kulka, winning Bulgaria's first ever medal in the European Cross Country Championships. At the 2013 European Cross Country Championships, he finished second overall again, except this time in a lengthier-distance U23 race. In 2014, he placed ninth of fifteen competitors in the finals of the men's 3000-meter steeplechase at the 2014 European Athletics Championships.

In 2015, he began trying several different disciplines for which he had trained less for in the past. On May 17, 2015, at the Elite Meeting in Montgeron, Tsenov won the men's 3000 meters. On June 10, 2015, he won the 1500 meters in Bulgaria's national championship. He fulfilled the 2016 Summer Olympics qualifying standard for the 3000 meters steeplechase on May 29, 2015.
