= Militsa Mircheva =

Bulgarian long-distance runner

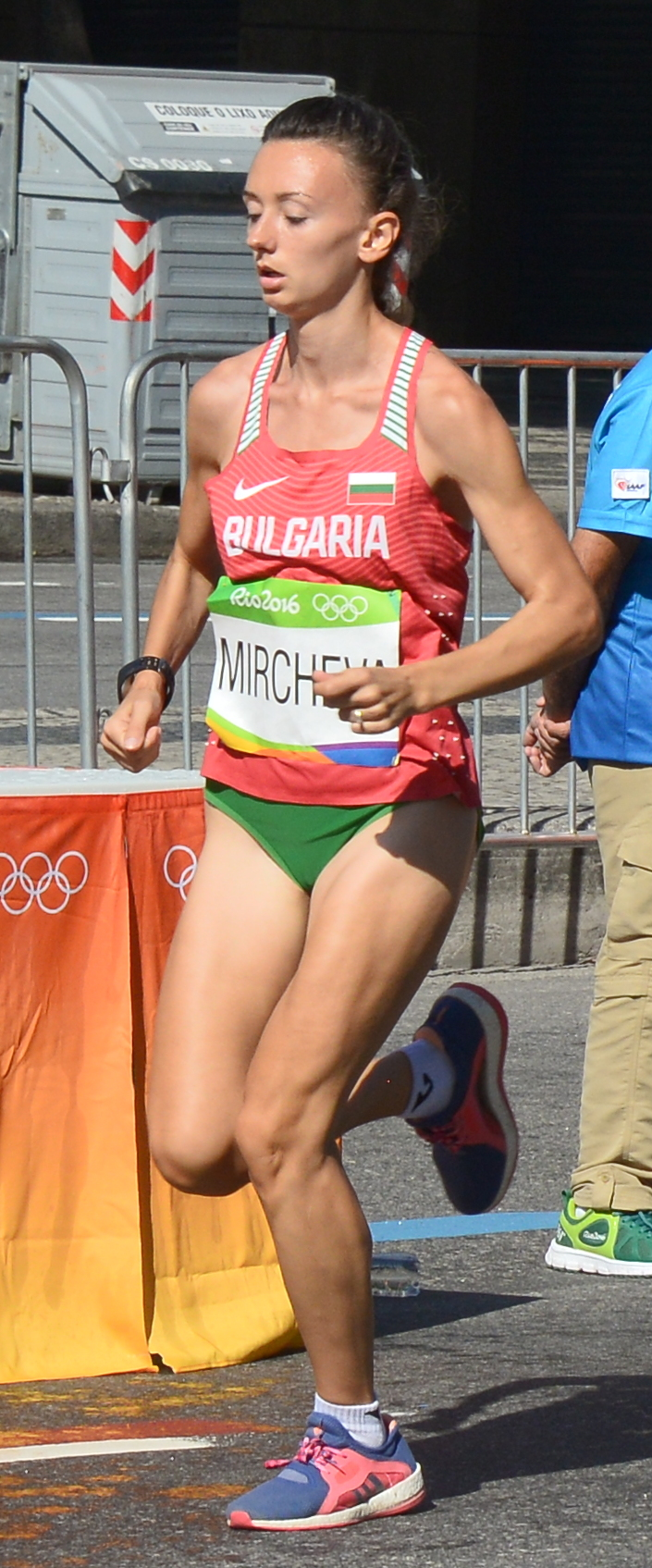
- Mircheva at the 2016 Olympics

Personal information
- Born: 24 May 1994 (age 32)
- Education: International Business College, Botevgrad
- Height: 165 cm (5 ft 5 in)
- Weight: 50 kg (110 lb)

Sport
- Sport: Track and field
- Events: Marathon, half marathon
- Coached by: Yolo Nikolov

Achievements and titles
- Personal bests: HM – 1:11:14 (2019); Marathon – 2:44:23 (2015)

Militsa Mircheva (Bulgarian: Милица Мирчева, born 24 May 1994) is a Bulgarian long-distance runner. She placed 108th in the 2016 Olympics marathon.
