= Bulgaria at the 2012 European Athletics Championships =

Bulgaria competed at the 2012 European Athletics Championships held in Helsinki, Finland, between 27 June to 1 July 2012.

== Medals ==
| Medal | Name | Event | Date |
|---|---|---|---|
| Gold | Ivet Lalova | Women's 100 metres | 28 June |

== Results ==
=== Men ===
==== Track ====
| Event | Athletes | Heats | | Semifinal | | Final | |
| Event | Athletes | Result | Rank | Result | Rank | Result | Rank |
|---|---|---|---|---|---|---|---|
| 100 m | Georgi Kirilov Georgiev | DNF | | did not advance | | | |
| 200 m | Kiril Kirilov | 21.45 | 27 | did not advance | | | |
| 200 m | Petar Kremenski | 21.03 | 18 Q | 21.08 | 16 | did not advance | |
| 400 m | Krasimir Braikov | 46.20 | 9 Q | 46.62 | 15 | did not advance | |
| 110 m hurdles | Martin Arnaudov | 14.32 | 32 | did not advance | | | |

==== Field ====
| Event | Athletes | Qualification | | Final | |
| Event | Athletes | Result | Rank | Result | Rank |
|---|---|---|---|---|---|
| Long jump | Nikolay Atanasov | NM | – | did not advance | |
| Triple jump | Zlatozar Atanasov | 16.58 | 8 q | 16.39 | 11 |
| Triple jump | Rumen Dimitrov | 15.60 | 25 | did not advance | |
| Triple jump | Momchil Karailiev | 16.73 | 5 q | 16.77 | 5 |
| High jump | Viktor Ninov | 2.15 | 21 | did not advance | |
| Shot put | Georgi Ivanov | 19.14 | 16 | did not advance | |

=== Women ===
==== Track ====
| Event | Athletes | Heats | | Semifinal | | Final | |
| Event | Athletes | Result | Rank | Result | Rank | Result | Rank |
|---|---|---|---|---|---|---|---|
| 100 m | Gabriela Laleva | 11.79 | 28 | did not advance | | | |
| 100 m | Ivet Lalova | 11.06 | 1 Q | 11.23 | 3 Q | 11.28 | 1st place, gold medalist(s) |
| 200 m | Ivet Lalova | 23.58 | 18 Q | 23.26 | 9 | did not advance | |
| 800 m | Teodora Kolarova | 2:02.45 | 8 | —N/a | | did not advance | |
| 3000 m steeplechase | Silvia Danekova | 9:42.72 | 11 q | —N/a | | 9:51.45 | 11 |
| 4 × 100 m relay | Gabriela Laleva; Tezdzhan Naimova; Karin Okoliye; Vaia Vladeva | 45.25 | 13 | —N/a | | did not advance | |

==== Field ====
| Event | Athletes | Qualification | | Final | |
| Event | Athletes | Result | Rank | Result | Rank |
|---|---|---|---|---|---|
| Triple jump | Andriana Bânova | NM | – | did not advance | |
| Triple jump | Petia Dacheva | NM | – | did not advance | |
| High jump | Mirela Demireva | 1.90 | 1 q | 1.92 | 8 |
| High jump | Venelina Veneva-Mateeva | 1.90 | 9 q | 1.80 | 12 |
| Shot put | Radoslava Mavrodieva | 17.55 | 6 Q | 18.14 | 6 |
