= Bulgaria at the 2010 European Athletics Championships =

Sporting event delegation

Bulgaria will be represented by 17 athletes at the 2010 European Athletics Championships held in Barcelona, Spain.

== Participants ==
=== Men ===
==== Track and field events ====
Athlete	Events	Heat		Semifinal		Final	
Athlete	Events	Result	Rank	Result	Rank	Result	Rank
Yordan Ilinov	200 m	21.65	31	Did not advance		Did not advance	

==== Field events ====
Event	Athletes	Qualification		Final	
Event	Athletes	Result	Rank	Result	Rank
Long jump	Nikolay Atanasov	No mark		Did not advance	
Triple jump	Momchil Karailiev	17.05	5 Q	15.24	14
Triple jump	Zhivko Petkov	16.20	22	Did not advance	
High jump	Viktor Ninov	2.23	15	Did not advance	
Pole vault	Spas Buhalov	5.30	25	Did not advance	
Shot put	Georgi Ivanov	18.28	22	Did not advance	

=== Women ===
==== Track and road events ====
Athlete	Events	Heat		Semifinal		Final	
Athlete	Events	Result	Rank	Result	Rank	Result	Rank
Inna Eftimova	100 m	11.79	26	Did not advance			
Ivet Lalova	100 m	11.58	18	Did not advance			
Vania Stambolova	400 m hurdles	54.77	2 Q	54.73	4 Q	53.82 (NR)	2nd place, silver medalist(s)
Inna Eftimova; Ivet Lalova; Gabriela Laleva; Monika Gachevska	4x100 m relay	44.72	15			Did not advance	

==== Field events ====
Event	Athletes	Qualification		Final	
Event	Athletes	Result	Rank	Result	Rank
Triple jump	Andriana Banova	13.95	18	Did not advance	
Triple jump	Petya Dacheva	No mark		Did not advance	
High jump	Venelina Veneva-Mateeva	1.83	22	Did not advance	
Shot put	Radoslava Mavrodieva	15.58	18	Did not advance	

== Results ==
2010 Barcelona	Gold	Silver	Bronze	Total
Bulgaria (BUL)	0	1	0	1
