= Bulgarian Athletic Federation =

Governing body of athletics in Bulgaria

- Sport: Athletics
- Abbreviation: BFLA
- Founded: 1924
- Affiliation: World Athletics
- Regional affiliation: EAA
- Headquarters: Sofia, Bulgaria
- President: Ivan Kolev
- Secretary: Galia Puhaleva and Velina Tsekova

Official website
- bfla.org
- (Bulgaria)

The Bulgarian Athletic Federation (Bulgarian: Българска федерация по лека атлетика) is the governing body for the sport of athletics in Bulgaria.

== Affiliations ==
- World Athletics
- European Athletic Association (EAA)
- Bulgarian Olympic Committee

== National records ==
BFLA maintains the Bulgarian records in athletics.
