= Ivet Lalova-Collio =

Bulgarian sprinter (born 1984)

Ivet Lalova-Colliо
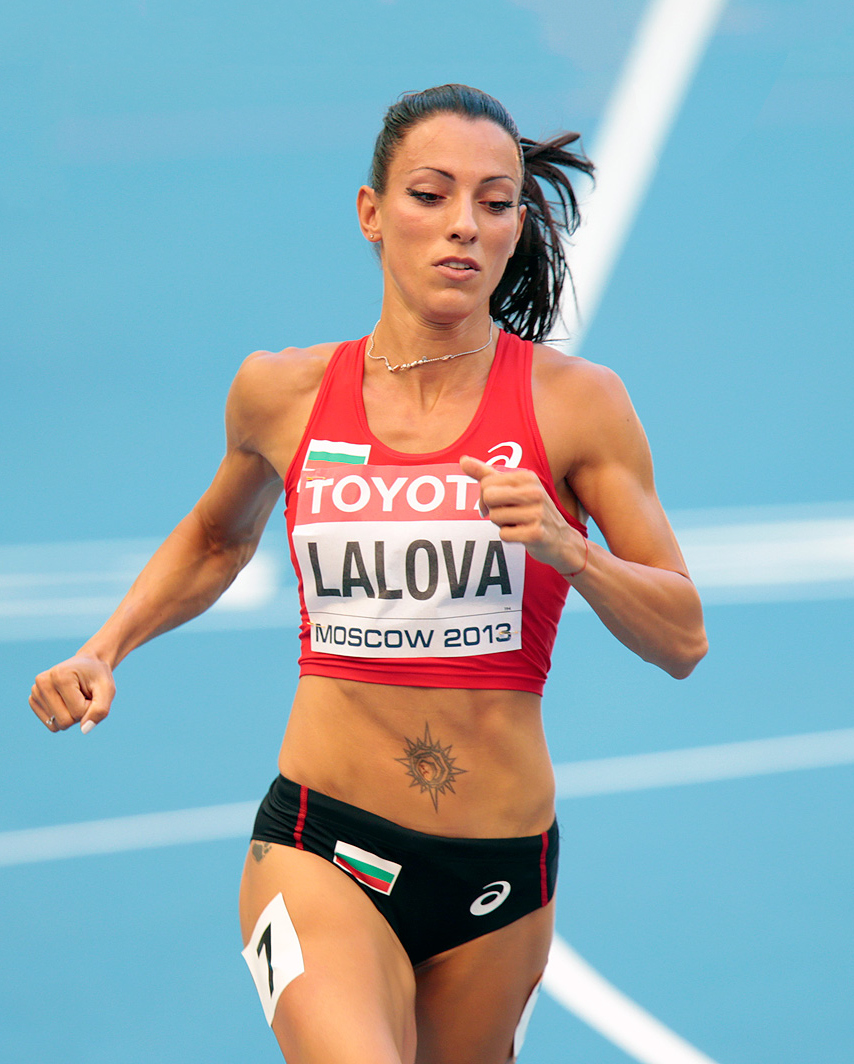
- Ivet Lalova-Collio in 2013 IAAF World Championships in Moscow

Personal information
- Native name: Ивет Лалова-Колио
- Full name: Ivet Miroslavova Lalova-Collio
- Nationality: Bulgaria
- Born: Ivet Miroslavova Lalova; 18 May 1984 (age 42) Sofia, Bulgaria
- Height: 168 cm (5 ft 6 in)
- Weight: 54 kg (119 lb)

Sport
- Sport: Athletics
- Events: 60 metres, 100 metres, 200 metres
- Coached by: K.Milanow (1996-2011); Roberto Bonomi (2011-present)

Achievements and titles
- Personal bests: 100 m: 10.77 (2004); 200 m: 22.32 (2015)
Medal record
| Event | 1st | 2nd | 3rd |
|---|---|---|---|
| European Championships | 1 | 2 | 0 |
| European Indoor Championships | 1 | 0 | 1 |
| European Junior Championships | 2 | 0 | 0 |
| Total | 4 | 2 | 1 |
European Championships
| Gold medal – first place | 2012 Helsinki | 100 m |
| Silver medal – second place | 2016 Amsterdam | 100 m |
| Silver medal – second place | 2016 Amsterdam | 200 m |
European Indoor Championships
| Gold medal – first place | 2005 Madrid | 200 m |
| Bronze medal – third place | 2013 Gothenburg | 60 m |
European Junior Championships
| Gold medal – first place | 2003 Tampere | 100 m |
| Gold medal – first place | 2003 Tampere | 200 m |

Ivet Miroslavova Lalova-Collio, née Lalova, (Bulgarian: Ивет Мирославова Лалова-Колио; born 18 May 1984, in Sofia) is a retired Bulgarian athlete who specialised in the 100 metres and 200 metres sprint events. She is the 13th-fastest woman in the history of the 100 metres. She finished fourth in the 100 metres and fifth in the 200 metres at the 2004 Summer Olympics. Her career was interrupted for two years between June 2005 and May 2007 due to a leg injury sustained in a collision with another athlete. In June 2012 she won gold at the 2012 European Athletics Championships in the Women's 100 metres. In July 2016 she won two silver medals at the 2016 European Athletics Championships in both the Women's 100 and 200 metres. She has participated in five editions of the Olympic Games.

== Biography ==
=== Childhood and junior years ===
Lalova's parents, Miroslav Lalov and Liliya Lalova, were athletes. Miroslav was the Bulgarian 200 metres champion in 1966. Lalova began competing in swimming and gymnastics at age 10, and soon switched to track and field. She became the Bulgarian Youth champion in the 100 metres competition in 2000, and placed fourth in the 200 metres at the 2001 IAAF World Youth Championships. At the 2003 European Athletics Junior Championships, she won both the 100 metres and 200 metres events.

=== Senior career ===
==== Early success and first gold (2004-2005) ====
On 19 June 2004 in Plovdiv, Lalova tied with Irina Privalova as the sixth fastest woman in 100 metres history (at that time), recording a time of 10.77 seconds. At the 2004 Summer Olympics, she placed 4th overall in the women's 100 m competition, and 5th in the 200 m. At the 2005 European Athletics Indoor Championships, she was awarded a gold medal for her time of 22.91 seconds in the 200 m.

==== Femur injury (2005) ====
On 14 June 2005, Lalova's career was interrupted when she broke her right femur after a collision with another athlete while warming up for the 100 m sprint at the Athens Super Grand Prix. In June 2006, the Bulgarian Olympic Committee awarded her the IOC "Sports and Fair Play" prize for her conduct in the aftermath of the incident, when she declined to seek compensation from her fellow competitor or the event's organizers.

Lalova was appointed to the European Athletic Association Athletes Commission for 2006–2010 following an election held in August at the 2006 European Athletics Championships.

==== Return to racing (2007-2011) ====
Lalova returned to competitive racing on 29 May 2007, at the Artur Takač Memorial in Belgrade, winning the 100 m in a time of 11.26 seconds. In August 2007 she reached the quarterfinals of the women's 100 m sprint at the IAAF World Championship in Osaka but failed to progress, finishing in fifth place with a time of 11.33 seconds.

At the 2008 Summer Olympics, Lalova was eliminated in the semifinals of the Women's 100 m, finishing her heat in seventh place with a time of 11.51 seconds, and was eliminated in the second round of the Women's 200 m.

In March 2011 she moved to Italy, joining the group of Professor Roberto Bonomi. Later in 2011 she started her season with 11.08 and 22.66 and after a week won the 100 m Diamond League event in Oslo with 11.01 (2.1 m/s). After another week she ran the second best time of her career - 10.96 s (+0.8 m/s wind) during the Balkan Championships in Sliven, Bulgaria.

==== Second career gold (2012-2014) ====
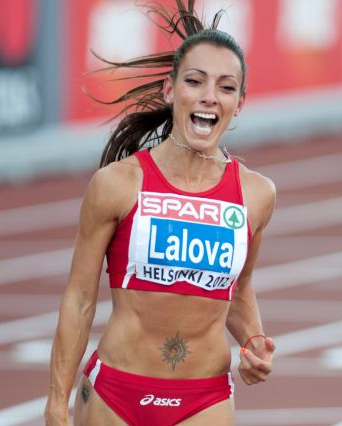
Ivet Lalova after winning the 2012 European Athletics Championships Women's 100 m event

At the 2012 European Athletics Championships in Helsinki, Lalova ran the distance in 11.06 during Round 1, setting the leading European result of the year so far. She went on to win her heat in the semifinals, as well as the final on 28 June, beating Olesya Povh and Lina Grinčikaitė for her second career gold medal from a major championship.

At the 2012 Summer Olympics in London, Lalova finished second in her heat during the quarterfinals on Women's 100 Metres, equaling her season best of 11.06. She was eliminated in the semifinals, where she ran the distance for 11.31, finishing 6th in her heat and 19th overall. At the 200 metres distance she finished 5th in her heat with a season-best time of 22.91. In the semifinals she ran the distance for 22.98, finishing 6th in her heat and missing on a place in the final.

In December 2012 Lalova opened her own sports club under the name Ivet Lalova Sprint Academy, meant to help amateur, children, youth and professional athletes in Bulgaria.

In her first 2013 IAAF Diamond League appearance, Lalova finished third in the 200 m sprint at the Golden Gala in Rome, with a personal season-best time of 22.78 (+1.2 m/s). This was also the best time for a European athlete so far throughout the year. She continued well in the next round at the Bislett Games in Oslo, winning the 100 m sprint with a season best of 11.04 (+1.2 m/s). She then finished 3rd in the 200 m at the British Grand Prix on 30 June, with a time of 23.02.

At the 2014 European Athletics Championships, she finished 5th in the Women's 100 m with a time of 11:33. In the 200 m event she ran a season best time of 23.17 in the first round, but only finished 6th in her semi-final group with 23.30 and did not qualify for the final.

==== First World Championships final (2015-2016) ====
At the 2015 World Championships in Athletics in Beijing Lalova recorded a season best 11.09 in the 100 metre qualifiers, but failed to pass the semifinal stage. In the 200 metre discipline she recorded a season best time of 22.54, qualifying for the semifinals. There she ran the distance in 22.32, qualifying for the final and setting a new personal best. In the final she finished 7th with a time of 22.41, becoming only the third Bulgarian female athlete to participate in a 200 m final at a World Championship, and the first one since the World Finals in Rome in 1987.

In the first 200 m event of the 2016 IAAF Diamond League, the Shanghai Golden Grand Prix, Lalova reached the final, placing 4th with a time of 23.04. On 18 May she won the silver medal in the 100 m event at the 2016 Beijing IAAF World Challenge, with a season best time of 11.11. Lalova then participated in her second Diamond League event of the year, the 2016 Golden Gala in Rome, finishing 4th in the 100 m final with a time of 11.15. On 6 June she won the Women's 100 m at the 2016 Gala Dei Castelli in Bellinzona, Switzerland, setting a time of 11.19 in the semi-final, and 11.20 in the final itself. Lalova's third Diamond League event of the year was at the 2016 Bislett Games in Oslo, Norway, where she won the bronze medal in the 200 m event with a season's best time of 22.78.

==== Double Silver medalist at Euro Championships (2016-2021) ====
At the 2016 European Athletics Championships in Amsterdam Lalova recorded a season best time of 22.57 in the Women's 200 metres semifinal, tied with Dina Asher-Smith for the fastest qualifying time in the discipline. In the final she improved her time to 22.52 and won Silver, her second major medal from European Championships and the first 200 m Euro medal ever for Bulgaria. In the Women's 100 metres Lalova won her heat in the semifinals with a time of 11.26, before clinching her second Silver of the tournament with 11.20 in the final. She took part in the 200m at the Rio 2016 Olympics where she placed 8th in the final. She also partipciated in the 100m heats.

Lalova opened her 2017 season by winning both the Women's 100 and 200 metres events at the Golden Grand Prix in Kawasaki, the third round of that year's IAAF World Challenge. She first triumphed in the 200 metres final with a time of 22.98, before winning gold in the 100 metres competition later that day with a time of 11.40.

Lalova's final competition was the 200m at the Tokyo 2020 Olympics held in August 2021 where she did not proceed beyond the heats.

==== After retirement ====
In January 2026, Lalova's was issued with a provisional suspension by the Athletics Integrity Unit after her Rio 2016 samples were re-tested under modern techniques and found to contain ostarine.

== Personal bests ==
Results were last updated on 2 June 2016.

| Discipline | Time | Date | Location | Event | Notes |
|---|---|---|---|---|---|
| 100 metres | 10.77 | 19 June 2004 | Plovdiv, Bulgaria | Europe Cup (first league) | |
| 200 metres | 22.32 | 27 August 2015 | Beijing, China | World Championships | |
| 50 metres indoor | 6.23 | 14 February 2012 | Liévin, France | | |
| 60 metres indoor | 7.12 | 3 March 2013 | Gothenburg, Sweden | European Indoor Championships | |
| 200 metres indoor | 22.87 | 1 February 2004 | Sofia, Bulgaria | | |

== Competition record ==
Representing Bulgaria
| Year | Competition | Venue | Position | Event | Measure | Notes |
|---|---|---|---|---|---|---|
| 2003 | European Junior Championships | (Finland) Tampere | 1st | 100 m | 11.43 | |
| 2003 | European Junior Championships | (Finland) Tampere | 1st | 200 m | 22.88 | |
| 2004 | Olympic Games | (Greece) Athens | 4th | 100 m | 11.00 | |
| 2004 | Olympic Games | (Greece) Athens | 5th | 200 m | 22.57 | |
| 2005 | European Indoor Championships | (Spain) Madrid | 1st | 200 m | 22.91 | NR |
| 2007 | World Championships | (Japan) Osaka | Quarter | 100 m | 11.33 | |
| 2008 | Olympic Games | (China) Beijing | Semi | 100 m | 11.51 | |
| 2008 | Olympic Games | (China) Beijing | Quarter | 200 m | 23.15 | |
| 2009 | World Championships | (Germany) Berlin | Quarter | 100 m | 11.54 | |
| 2009 | World Championships | (Germany) Berlin | Heats | 200 m | 23.60 | SB |
| 2010 | European Championships | (Spain) Barcelona | Round 1 | 100 m | 11.58 | |
| 2011 | World Championships | (South Korea) Daegu | 7th | 100 m | 11.27 | |
| 2011 | World Championships | (South Korea) Daegu | Semi | 200 m | 23.03 | |
| 2012 | European Championships | (Finland) Helsinki | 1st | 100 m | 11.28 | |
| 2012 | Olympic Games | (United Kingdom) London | Semi | 100 m | 11.31 | |
| 2012 | Olympic Games | (United Kingdom) London | Semi | 200 m | 22.98 | SB |
| 2013 | European Indoor Championships | (Sweden) Gothenburg | 3rd | 60 m | 7.12 | PB |
| 2013 | World Championships | (Russia) Moscow | Semi | 100 m | 11.10 | |
| 2013 | World Championships | (Russia) Moscow | Semi | 200 m | 22.81 | |
| 2014 | European Championships | (Switzerland) Zürich | 5th | 100 m | 11.33 | |
| 2014 | European Championships | (Switzerland) Zürich | Semi | 200 m | 23.30 | |
| 2015 | World Championships | (China) Beijing | Semi | 100 m | 11.13 | |
| 2015 | World Championships | (China) Beijing | 7th | 200 m | 22.41 | |
| 2016 | European Championships | (Netherlands) Amsterdam | 2nd | 100 m | 11.20 | |
| 2016 | European Championships | (Netherlands) Amsterdam | 2nd | 200 m | 22.52 | SB |
| 2016 | Olympic Games | (Brazil) Rio de Janeiro | Semi | 100 m | DNS | |
| 2016 | Olympic Games | (Brazil) Rio de Janeiro | 8th | 200 m | 22.69 | |
| 2017 | World Championships | (United Kingdom) London | Semi | 100 m | 11.25 | SB |
| 2017 | World Championships | (United Kingdom) London | Semi | 200 m | 22.96 | |
| 2018 | European Championships | (Germany) Berlin | 5th | 200 m | 22.82 | |
| 2019 | World Championships | (Qatar) Doha | 7th | 200 m | 22.77 | |

== See also ==
- 100 metres - All-time top 25 women

Olympic Games
| Preceded by Yordan Yovchev | Flagbearer for Bulgaria; Rio de Janeiro 2016 | Succeeded by Maria Grozdeva |
