= Greece at the 2026 European Athletics Championships =

- Flag of Greece
- WA code: GRE

in Birmingham, United Kingdom 10–16 August 2026
- Competitors: 60 (33 men and 27 women)
- Medals: Gold 1 Silver 1 Bronze 0 Total 2

European Athletics Championships appearances (overview)
- 1934; 1938; 1946; 1950; 1954; 1958; 1962; 1966; 1969; 1971; 1974; 1978; 1982; 1986; 1990; 1994; 1998; 2002; 2006; 2010; 2012; 2014; 2016; 2018; 2022; 2024; 2026

Greece competed at the 2026 European Athletics Championships in Birmingham, United Kingdom from 10–16 August 2026.

== Medallists ==
Medal	Name	Event	Date
Gold	Miltiadis Tentoglou	Men's long jump	11 August
Silver	Emmanouil Karalis	Men's pole vault	16 August

== Results ==
Greece entered the following athletes.

Key

- Q = Qualified for the next round
- q = Qualified for the next round as a fastest loser or, in field events, by position without achieving the qualifying target
- NR = National record
- PB = Personal best
- SB = Season best
- N/A = Round not applicable for the event

=== Men ===
Track and road events

Athlete	Event	Heat		Semifinal		Final	
Athlete	Event	Result	Rank	Result	Rank	Result	Rank
Sotirios Garaganis	200 m	21.23	20	Did not advance			
Vasileios Myrianthopoulos	200 m	21.17	17	Did not advance			
George John Franks	400 m	Bye		45.15	3	Did not advance	
Georgios Stamoulis	Marathon	—N/a					
Christos-Panagiotis Roumtsios	110 m hurdles	14.12	17	Did not advance			
Dimitris Levantinos	400 m hurdles	50.03 PB	14	Did not advance			
Georgios Kritoulis	Half marathon walk	—N/a				1:29:39 PB	17
Konstantinos-Alexandros Ntentopoulos	Half marathon walk	—N/a				1:37:34 SB	24
Andreas Papastergiou	Half marathon walk	—N/a				1:30:59 PB	20
Andreas Karagiannis	Marathon walk	—N/a				3:44:32 PB	27
Georgios Kelepouris	Marathon walk	—N/a				3:24:37 PB	26
Alexandros Papamichail	Marathon walk	—N/a				3:18:25 NR	21
Ioannis Voskopoulos; Nikolaos Panagiotopoulos; Sotirios Garaganis; Vasileios Myrianthopoulos	4 × 100 m relay	39.17 SB	3 Q	—N/a			

Field events

Athlete	Event	Qualification		Final	
Athlete	Event	Distance	Position	Distance	Position
Antonios Merlos	High jump	2.23	8 q	2.18	11
Antrea Mita	High jump	2.19	12 q	2.18	11
Emmanouil Karalis	Pole vault	5.60	1 q	6.00	2nd place, silver medalist(s)
Ioannis Rizos	Pole vault	NM		Did not advance	
Nikolaos Stamatonikolos	Long jump	7.55	22	Did not advance	
Miltiadis Tentoglou	Long jump	8.26	3 Q	8.44	1st place, gold medalist(s)
Nikolaos Andrikopoulos	Triple jump	15.54	21	Did not advance	
Andreas Pantazis	Triple jump	15.94	15	Did not advance	
Dimitrios Tsiamis	Triple jump	16.12	10 q	16.27	8
Konstantinos Gennikis	Shot put	19.37	14	Did not advance	
Iason Machairas	Shot put	NM		Did not advance	
Odysseas Mouzenidis	Shot put	18.35	25	Did not advance	
Dimitrios Pavlidis	Discus throw	63.14	6 q	64.34 SB	8
Mihail Anastasakis	Hammer throw	72.57	18	Did not advance	
Christos Frantzeskakis	Hammer throw	75.22	12 q	75.72	10
Georgios Papanastasiou	Hammer throw	67.89	30	Did not advance	
Dimitrios Tsitsos	Javelin throw	80.95 PB	4 q		

=== Women ===
Track and road events

Athlete	Event	Heat		Semifinal		Final	
Athlete	Event	Result	Rank	Result	Rank	Result	Rank
Polyniki Emmanouilidou	100 m	11.31	13	Did not advance			
Rafaéla Spanoudaki-Hatziriga	100 m	11.42	17	Did not advance			
Polyniki Emmanouilidou	200 m	23.15 SB	3 q	23.06 SB	4	Did not advance	
Rafaéla Spanoudaki-Hatziriga	200 m	23.37 SB	11 q	23.45	7	Did not advance	
Dimitra Tsoukala	200 m	23.77	21	Did not advance			
Georgia-Maria Despollari	800 m	1:59.29 NR	6	Did not advance			
Stamatia Noula	Marathon	—N/a					
Anastasia Antonopoulou	Half marathon walk	—N/a				1:40:30 PB	21
Antigoni Drisbioti	Marathon walk	—N/a				3:22:16 NR	4
Olga Fiaska	Marathon walk	—N/a				DNF	
Efstathia Kourkoutsaki	Marathon walk	—N/a				3:51:36 PB	15
Panagiota Tsinopoulou	Marathon walk	—N/a				3:25:14 PB	5
Apostolia Antonatou; Rafaéla Spanoudaki-Hatziriga; Dimitra Tsoukala; Polyniki Emmanouilidou	4 × 100 m relay	DNF		—N/a		Did not advance	

Field events

Athlete	Event	Qualification		Final	
Athlete	Event	Distance	Position	Distance	Position
Panagiota Dosi	High jump	1.84	24	Did not advance	
Ariadni Adamopoulou	Pole vault	4.40	11 q	4.30	11
Katerina Stefanidi	Pole vault	4.50 SB	1 q	4.60 SB	6
Natalia Besi	Long jump	NM		Did not advance	
Andriana Goga	Long jump	6.27	24	Did not advance	
Spyridoula Karydi	Triple jump	14.03	13	Did not advance	
Maria Mangoulia	Shot put	14.71	26	Did not advance	
Maria Rafailidou	Shot put	14.63	27	Did not advance	
Chrysoula Anagnostopoulou	Discus throw	55.13	21	Did not advance	
Stamatia Scarvelis	Hammer throw	68.49	12 q	69.54 SB	7
Elina Tzengko	Javelin throw	59.82 SB	6 q		

Combined events – Heptathlon

Athlete	Event	100H	HJ	SP	200 m	LJ	JT	800 m	Final	Rank
Anastasia Ntragkomirova	Result	14.18 SB	1.74	14.98	DNF					
Anastasia Ntragkomirova	Points	953	903	860	DNF					
