= Greece at the 2025 European Athletics Indoor Championships =

- WA code: GRE
- National federation: Hellenic Athletic Federation
- Website: www.segas.gr/index.php/el/

in (Netherlands) Apeldoorn
- Competitors: 19 (10 men and 9 women) in 13 events
- Medals Ranked TBDth: Gold 1 Silver 0 Bronze 0 Total 1

European Athletics Indoor Championships appearances (overview)
- 1966; 1967; 1968; 1969; 1970; 1971; 1972; 1973; 1974; 1975; 1976; 1977; 1978; 1979; 1980; 1981; 1982; 1983; 1984; 1985; 1986; 1987; 1988; 1989; 1990; 1992; 1994; 1996; 1998; 2000; 2002; 2005; 2007; 2009; 2011; 2013; 2015; 2017; 2019; 2021; 2023

Greece competed at the 2025 European Athletics Indoor Championships in Apeldoorn, Netherlands, between 6 and 9 March 2025, with 19 athletes.

== Results ==
Rank	Name	Event	Date	Notes
Gold	Emmanouil Karalis	Men's pole vault	9 March	5.90 m
11th	Tatiana Gusin	Women's high jump	7 March	1.85 m
12th	Ariadni Adamopoulou	Women's pole vault	6 March	4.45 m SB
13th	Antonios Merlos	Men's high jump	6 March	2.18 m
13th	Dimitrios Tsiamis	Men's triple jump	7 March	15.86 m
17th (sf)	Polyniki Emmanouilidou	Women's 60 metres	9 March	7.22 s
