= Greece at the 2016 European Athletics Championships =

- WA code: GRE
- National federation: Hellenic Athletic Federation
- Website: www.segas.gr/index.php/el/

in (Netherlands) Amsterdam
- Competitors: 33 (15 men and 18 women) in 26 events
- Medals Ranked 14th: Gold 1 Silver 0 Bronze 1 Total 2

European Athletics Championships appearances (overview)
- 1934; 1938; 1946; 1950; 1954; 1958; 1962; 1966; 1969; 1971; 1974; 1978; 1982; 1986; 1990; 1994; 1998; 2002; 2006; 2010; 2012; 2014; 2016; 2018; 2022; 2024; 2026

Greece competed at the 2016 European Athletics Championships in Amsterdam, Netherlands, between 6 and 10 July 2016.

== Medals ==
Medal	Name	Event	Date	Notes
Gold	Katerina Stefanidi	Women's pole vault	9 July	4.81 m CR
Bronze	Paraskevi Papahristou	Women's triple jump	10 July	14.47 m

== Results ==
=== Men ===
Track & road events

Athlete	Event	Heat		Semifinal		Final	
Athlete	Event	Result	Rank	Result	Rank	Result	Rank
Likourgos-Stefanos Tsakonas	200 m	—N/a		20.48	7	Did not advance	
Konstadinos Douvalidis	110 m hurdles	—N/a		13.50	11	Did not advance	
Konstantinos Gkelaouzos	Half marathon	—N/a				1:08:09	61

Field Events

Athlete	Event	Qualification		Final	
Athlete	Event	Distance	Rank	Distance	Rank
Konstadinos Baniotis	High jump	2.25	12 Q	2.24	6
Konstadinos Filippidis	Pole vault	5.50	2 q	5.30	7
Dimitrios Patsoukakis	Pole vault	5.35	19	Did not advance	
Nikolaos Kapsis	Long jump	7.23	24	Did not advance	
Mihail Mertzanidis-Despoteris	Long jump	7.76	15	Did not advance	
Yeoryios Tsakonas	Long jump	7.45	23	Did not advance	
Dimitrios Baltadouros	Triple jump	15.99	25	Did not advance	
Dimitrios Tsiamis	Triple jump	16.16	22	Did not advance	
Nikolaos Skarvelis	Shot put	20.11	10 q	19.55	11
Paraskevas Batzavalis	Javelin throw	77.86	22	Did not advance	
Ioannis Kiriazis	Javelin throw	81.92	6 Q	75.57	12
Mihail Anastasakis	Hammer throw	74.01	6 q	75.89	4

=== Women ===
Track & road events

Athlete	Event	Heat		Semifinal		Final	
Athlete	Event	Result	Rank	Result	Rank	Result	Rank
Maria Belibasaki	100 m	11.55	=11 q	11.62	=17	Did not advance	
Maria Belibasaki	200 m	23.03 PB	2 Q	23.16	9	Did not advance	
Anna Vasiliou	400 m	53.98	13 q	53.77	22	Did not advance	
Irini Vasiliou	400 m	53.86	10 Q	52.58	14	Did not advance	
Anastasia-Panayiota Marinakou	1500 m	4:16.53	16	—N/a		Did not advance	
Alexi Pappas	5000 m	—N/a				15:56.75	11
Alexi Pappas	10000 m	—N/a				32:27.80	11
Elisavet Pesiridou	100 m hurdles	12.98	1 Q	12.95	6 Q	13.05	6
Maria Belibasaki; Ekaterini Dalaka; Maria Gatou; Elisavet Pesiridou	4 x 100 m relay	44.58	14	—N/a		Did not advance	
Ekaterini Dalaka; Despina Mourta; Anna Vasiliou; Irini Vasiliou	4 x 400 m relay	3:31.66 SB	=10	—N/a		Did not advance	
Ourania Rebouli	Half marathon	—N/a				1:11:52 NR	6

Field Events

Athlete	Event	Qualification		Final	
Athlete	Event	Distance	Rank	Distance	Rank
Nikoleta Kiriakopoulou	Pole vault	4.45	6 q	4.55	4
Katerina Stefanidi	Pole vault	4.50	1 q	4.81 CR	1st place, gold medalist(s)
Haido Alexouli	Long jump	6.43	14	Did not advance	
Efthimia Kolokitha	Long jump	5.91w	24	Did not advance	
Paraskevi Papahristou	Triple jump	14.00	6 Q	14.47	3rd place, bronze medalist(s)
Stamatia Skarvelis	Shot put	15.50	26	Did not advance	
Hrisoula Anagnostopoulou	Discus throw	59.13	13 Q	59.23	9

Combined events – Heptathlon

Athlete	Event	100H	HJ	SP	200 m	LJ	JT	800 m	Final	Rank
Sofia Ifantidou	Result	13.79	1.65 SB	13.23 SB	26.08	6.04 SB	56.86 CB	2:18.59	6025 SB	8
Sofia Ifantidou	Points	1008	795	743	790	862	934	843	6025 SB	8

Key

- Q = Qualified for the next round
- q = Qualified for the next round as a fastest loser or, in field events, by position without achieving the qualifying target
- NR = National record
- N/A = Round not applicable for the event
- Bye = Athlete not required to compete in round
