= Greece at the 2014 European Athletics Championships =

- WA code: GRE
- National federation: Hellenic Athletics Federation
- Website: www.segas.gr/index.php/el/

in (Switzerland) Zürich
- Competitors: 26
- Medals Ranked 17th: Gold 0 Silver 2 Bronze 0 Total 2

European Athletics Championships appearances (overview)
- 1934; 1938; 1946; 1950; 1954; 1958; 1962; 1966; 1969; 1971; 1974; 1978; 1982; 1986; 1990; 1994; 1998; 2002; 2006; 2010; 2012; 2014; 2016; 2018; 2022; 2024; 2026

Greece is competing at the 2014 European Athletics Championships in Zürich, Switzerland, from 12 to 17 August 2014. Greek Athletics named a team of 26 athletes.

== Medals ==
Medal	Name	Event	Date	Notes
Silver	Katerina Stefanidi	Women's pole vault	14 August	4.60 m
Silver	Louis Tsatoumas	Men's long jump	17 August	8.15 m

== Results ==
=== Men ===
Track and road

Event	Athletes	Heats		Semifinal		Final	
Event	Athletes	Result	Rank	Result	Rank	Result	Rank
100 metres	Efthymios Stergioulis	10.46	27	Did not advance			
200 metres	Lykourgos-Stefanos Tsakonas	20.64	10 Q	20.40	7 Q	20.53	7
110 m hurdles	Konstadinos Douvalidis	13.54	15 q	13.56	12	Did not advance	
Marathon
20 km walk	Alexandros Papamichail	—N/a				DNF	–
50 km walk	Alexandros Papamichail	—N/a				3:49:58	13

Field events

Event	Athletes	Qualification		Final	
Event	Athletes	Distance	Position	Distance	Position
Long jump	Georgios Tsakonas	7.64	19	Did not advance	
Long jump	Louis Tsatoumas	8.19	1 Q	8.15	2nd place, silver medalist(s)
Long jump	Nikolaos Xenikakis	7.12	27	Did not advance	
Triple jump	Dimitrios Tsiamis	16.53	11 q	16.39	10
High jump	Konstadinos Baniotis	2.15	20	Did not advance	
High jump	Antonios Mastoras	2.15	21	Did not advance	
Pole vault	Konstadinos Filippidis	5.50	9 q	5.60	7
Pole vault	Dimitrios Patsoukakis	5.30	16	Did not advance	
Discus throw	Georgios Tremos	59.86	19	Did not advance	
Javelin throw	Spyridon Lembesis	74.14	24	Did not advance	

=== Women ===
Track and road

Event	Athletes	Heats		Semifinal		Final	
Event	Athletes	Result	Rank	Result	Rank	Result	Rank
100 metres	Maria Gatou	DNF	–	Did not advance			
100 metres	Georgia Kokloni	11.46	20 q	11.69	23	Did not advance	
200 metres	Maria Belibasaki	23.34	13 Q	23.37	18	Did not advance	
200 metres	Andrianna Ferra	23.88	26	Did not advance			
10000 metres	Anastasia Karakatsani	—N/a				32:53.22	22
100 m hurdles	Elisavet Pesiridou	13.27	25	Did not advance			
4 x 100 metres relay	Maria Belibasaki; Andrianna Ferra; Georgia Kokloni; Elisavet Pesiridou	43.81	9	—N/a		Did not advance	
20 km walk	Antigoni Drisbioti	—N/a				1:34:03	20
20 km walk	Despina Zapounidou	—N/a				1:35:54	24

Field events

Event	Athletes	Qualification		Final	
Event	Athletes	Distance	Position	Distance	Position
Long jump	Efthymia Kolokytha	6.00	25	Did not advance	
Pole vault	Nikolia Kyriakopoulou	4.45	13 q	4.35	7
Pole vault	Katerina Stefanidi	4.45	6 q	4.60	2nd place, silver medalist(s)
Discus throw	Hrysoula Anagnostopoulou	51.08	18	Did not advance	
