= Greece at the 2018 European Athletics Championships =

- WA code: GRE
- National federation: Hellenic Athletic Federation
- Website: www.segas.gr/index.php/el/

in (Germany) Berlin
- Competitors: 37 (15 men and 22 women) in 25 events
- Medals Ranked 5th: Gold 3 Silver 2 Bronze 1 Total 6

European Athletics Championships appearances (overview)
- 1934; 1938; 1946; 1950; 1954; 1958; 1962; 1966; 1969; 1971; 1974; 1978; 1982; 1986; 1990; 1994; 1998; 2002; 2006; 2010; 2012; 2014; 2016; 2018; 2022; 2024

Greece competed at the 2018 European Athletics Championships in Berlin, Germany, between 6 and 12 August 2018 with 37 athletes.

== Medals ==
| Medal | Name | Event | Date | Notes |
|---|---|---|---|---|
| Gold | Miltiadis Tentoglou | Men's long jump | 8 August | 8.25 m SB |
| Gold | Katerina Stefanidi | Women's pole vault | 9 August | 4.85 m CR |
| Gold | Paraskevi Papahristou | Women's triple jump | 10 August | 14.60 m =SB |
| Silver | Nikoleta Kyriakopoulou | Women's pole vault | 9 August | 4.80 m SB |
| Silver | Maria Belibasaki | Women's 400 metres | 11 August | 50.45 s NR |
| Bronze | Dimitrios Tsiamis | Men's triple jump | 12 August | 16.78 m SB |

== Results ==
=== Men ===
Track & road events

| Athlete | Event | Heat | | Semifinal | | Final | |
| Athlete | Event | Result | Rank | Result | Rank | Result | Rank |
|---|---|---|---|---|---|---|---|
| Ioannis Nyfantopoulos | 100 m | 10.44 | 3 | did not advance | | | |
| Likourgos-Stefanos Tsakonas | 200 m | 20.49 | 1 Q | 20.54 | 6 | did not advance | |
| Panagiotis Trivyzas | 200 m | 21.18 | 6 | did not advance | | | |
| Konstadinos Douvalidis | 110 m hurdles | 13.68 | 4 Q | 13.56 | 5 | did not advance | |
| Likourgos-Stefanos Tsakonas; Konstadinos Douvalidis; Ioannis Nyfantopoulos; Panagiotis Trivyzas; Asimakis Stergioulis | 4 × 100 m relay | 39.49 SB | 6 | — | | did not advance | |
| Alexandros Papamichail | 20 km walk | — | | | | 1:22:51 | 15 |
| Konstantinos Gkelaouzos | Marathon | — | | | | 2:22:24 | 44 |
| Dimosthenis Magginas | Marathon | — | | | | 2:44:57 | 58 |
| Panagiotis Karaiskos | Marathon | — | | | | 2:25:37 PB | 50 |

Field Events

| Athlete | Event | Qualification | | Final | |
| Athlete | Event | Distance | Rank | Distance | Rank |
|---|---|---|---|---|---|
| Konstadinos Baniotis | High jump | 2.21 | 10 q | 2.19 | 10 |
| Konstadinos Filippidis | Pole vault | 5.61 | 7 q | 5.75 | 6 |
| Miltiadis Tentoglou | Long jump | 8.15 | 1 Q | 8.25 SB | 1st place, gold medalist(s) |
| Dimitrios Tsiamis | Triple jump | 16.69 | 4 q | 16.78 SB | 3rd place, bronze medalist(s) |
| Nikolaos Skarvelis | Shot put | 20.24 | 6 q | 20.11 | 11 |
| Mihail Anastasakis | Hammer throw | 75.61 | 5 q | 73.33 | 9 |

=== Women ===
Track & road events

| Athlete | Event | Heat | | Semifinal | | Final | |
| Athlete | Event | Result | Rank | Result | Rank | Result | Rank |
|---|---|---|---|---|---|---|---|
| Rafailía Spanoudaki-Hatziriga | 100 m | 11.63 | 7 | did not advance | | | |
| Maria Belibasaki | 400 m | Bye | | 51.23 | 2 Q | 50.45 NR | 2nd place, silver medalist(s) |
| Irini Vasiliou | 400 m | 53.37 | 7 | did not advance | | | |
| Despina Mourta | 400 m | 52.96 PB | 5 | did not advance | | | |
| Elisavet Pesiridou | 100 m hurdles | 13.10 | 2 Q | 13.00 SB | 3 | did not advance | |
| Maria Belibasaki; Elisavet Pesiridou; Rafailía Spanoudaki-Hatziriga; Grigoria Keramida; Korina Politi | 4 x 100 m relay | 44.48 SB | 7 | — | | did not advance | |
| Maria Belibasaki; Irini Vasiliou; Despina Mourta; Anna Vasiliou; Evangelia Zygori; Elpida Karkalatou | 4 x 400 m relay | 3:34.69 | 6 | — | | did not advance | |
| Antigoni Drisbioti | 20 km walk | — | | | | 1:32:16 SB | 13 |
| Ourania Rebouli | Marathon | — | | | | 2:44:32 | 36 |
| Gloria Priviletzio | Marathon | — | | | | 2:38:39 PB | 26 |
| Sonia Tsekini | Marathon | — | | | | DNS | |

Field Events

| Athlete | Event | Qualification | | Final | |
| Athlete | Event | Distance | Rank | Distance | Rank |
|---|---|---|---|---|---|
| Nikoleta Kiriakopoulou | Pole vault | 4.45 | 4 q | 4.80 SB | 2nd place, silver medalist(s) |
| Katerina Stefanidi | Pole vault | 4.55 | 1 Q | 4.85 CR | 1st place, gold medalist(s) |
| Eleni Polak | Pole vault | 4.45 | 9 q | NM | 12 |
| Haido Alexouli | Long jump | 6.21 | 23 | did not advance | |
| Paraskevi Papahristou | Triple jump | 14.49 | 1 Q | 14.60 =SB | 1st place, gold medalist(s) |
| Stamatia Skarvelis | Hammer throw | 67.97 | 15 | did not advance | |
| Hrisoula Anagnostopoulou | Discus throw | 56.52 | 12 q | 57.34 | 10 |
| Sofia Yfantidou | Javelin throw | 52.26 | 22 | did not advance | |

Key

- Q = Qualified for the next round
- q = Qualified for the next round as a fastest loser or, in field events, by position without achieving the qualifying target
- NR = National record
- N/A = Round not applicable for the event
- Bye = Athlete not required to compete in round
