= Greece at the 1946 European Athletics Championships =

Greece at the 1938 European Athletics Championships
- WA code: GRE
- National federation: Hellenic Athletics Federation
- Website: www.segas.gr/index.php/el/

in (Norway) Oslo
- Competitors: 5
- Medals: Gold 0 Silver 0 Bronze 0 Total 0

European Athletics Championships appearances (overview)
- 1934; 1938; 1946; 1950; 1954; 1958; 1962; 1966; 1969; 1971; 1974; 1978; 1982; 1986; 1990; 1994; 1998; 2002; 2006; 2010; 2012; 2014; 2016; 2018; 2022; 2024; 2026

Greece (GRE) has competed at every celebration of the European Athletics Championships since the 1934 European Athletics Championships in Turin, Italy.

At the 1946 European Championships in Oslo, Norway, the Greek team participated with 5 athletes, without winning any medals.

== See also ==
- Greece at the IAAF World Championships in Athletics
- Greece at the IAAF World Indoor Championships in Athletics
- Greece at the European Athletics Indoor Championships
- Greece at the European Athletics Championships
