= Greece at the European Athletics Championships =

- WA code: GRE
- National federation: Hellenic Athletics Federation
- Website: www.segas.gr/index.php/el/
- Medals Ranked 17th: Gold 17 Silver 11 Bronze 11 Total 39

European Athletics Championships appearances (overview)
- 1934; 1938; 1946; 1950; 1954; 1958; 1962; 1966; 1969; 1971; 1974; 1978; 1982; 1986; 1990; 1994; 1998; 2002; 2006; 2010; 2012; 2014; 2016; 2018; 2022; 2024; 2026

Greece (GRE) has competed at every celebration of the European Athletics Championships since the 1934 European Athletics Championships in Turin, Italy. As of 2024, Greek athletes have won a total of 37 medals.

== Summary ==
Host nation

Championships	Athletes	Gold	Silver	Bronze	Total	Rank
1934 Turin	2	0	0	1	1	13th
1938 Paris	5	0	0	0	0	-
1946 Oslo	5	0	0	0	0	-
1950 Brussels	12	0	0	0	0	-
1954 Bern	7	0	0	0	0	-
1958 Stockholm	14	0	0	0	0	-
1962 Belgrade	11	0	0	0	0	-
1966 Budapest	15	0	1	0	1	13th
1969 Athens	24	0	0	0	0	-
1971 Helsinki	4	0	0	1	1	13th
1974 Rome	12	0	0	0	0	-
1978 Prague	13	0	0	0	0	-
1982 Athens	29	1	0	1	2	12th
1986 Stuttgart	6	0	0	0	0	-
1990 Split	11	0	0	0	0	-
1994 Helsinki	18	0	0	1	1	22nd
1998 Budapest	48	1	0	2	3	13th
2002 Munich	51	4	0	2	6	5th
2006 Gothenburg	39	1	2	0	3	13th
2010 Barcelona	33	0	0	0	0	-
2012 Helsinki	24	0	0	1	1	26th
2014 Zurich	26	0	2	0	2	17th
2016 Amsterdam	35	1	0	1	2	14th
2018 Berlin	37	3	2	1	6	5th
2022 Munich	40	4	1	0	5	4th
2024 Rome	56	1	2	0	3	13th
2026 Birmingham	60	1	1	0	2	12th
Total		17	11	11	39	17th

== Medalists ==
Name	Championships	Event	Medal
Katerina Stefanidi	2016 Amsterdam	Women's pole vault	Gold
Katerina Stefanidi	2018 Berlin	Women's pole vault	Gold
Katerina Stefanidi	2014 Zürich	Women's pole vault	Silver
Katerina Stefanidi	2022 Munich	Women's pole vault	Silver
Katerina Stefanidi	2024 Rome	Women's pole vault	Silver
Miltiadis Tentoglou	2018 Berlin	Men's long jump	Gold
Miltiadis Tentoglou	2022 Munich	Men's long jump	Gold
Miltiadis Tentoglou	2024 Rome	Men's long jump	Gold
Miltiadis Tentoglou	2026 Birmingham	Men's long jump	Gold
Antigoni Drisbioti	2022 Munich	Women's 35 km walk	Gold
Antigoni Drisbioti	2022 Munich	Women's 20 km walk	Gold
Ekaterini Thanou	2002 Munich	Women's 100 metres	Gold
Ekaterini Thanou	1998 Budapest	Women's 100 metres	Bronze
Paraskevi Papahristou	2018 Berlin	Women's triple jump	Gold
Paraskevi Papahristou	2016 Amsterdam	Women's triple jump	Bronze
Anna Verouli	1982 Athens	Women's javelin throw	Gold
Olga Vasdeki	1998 Budapest	Women's triple jump	Gold
Konstantinos Kenteris	2002 Munich	Men's 200 metres	Gold
Mirela Manjani	2002 Munich	Women's javelin throw	Gold
Ekaterini Voggoli	2002 Munich	Women's discus throw	Gold
Periklis Iakovakis	2006 Gothenburg	Men's 400 metres hurdles	Gold
Elina Tzengko	2022 Munich	Women's javelin throw	Gold
Emmanouil Karalis	2024 Rome	Men's pole vault	Silver
Emmanouil Karalis	2026 Birmingham	Men's pole vault	Silver
Nikoleta Kyriakopoulou	2018 Berlin	Women's pole vault	Silver
Nikoleta Kyriakopoulou	2012 Helsinki	Women's pole vault	Bronze
Christos Papanikolaou	1966 Budapest	Men's pole vault	Silver
Hrysopiyi Devetzi	2006 Gothenburg	Women's triple jump	Silver
Fani Halkia	2006 Gothenburg	Women's 400 m hurdles	Silver
Louis Tsatoumas	2014 Zurich	Men's long jump	Silver
Maria Belibasaki	2018 Berlin	Women's 400 metres	Silver
Christos Mantikas	1934 Torino	Men's 400 m hurdles	Bronze
Vasilis Papageorgopoulos	1971 Helsinki	Men's 100 metres	Bronze
Sofia Sakorafa	1982 Athens	Women's javelin throw	Bronze
Konstantinos Koukodimos	1994 Helsinki	Men's long jump	Bronze
Haralabos Papadias	1998 Budapest	Men's 100 metres	Bronze
Anastasia Kelesidou	2002 Munich	Women's discus throw	Bronze
Alexandros Papadimitriou	2002 Munich	Men's hammer throw	Bronze
Dimitrios Tsiamis	2018 Berlin	Men's triple jump	Bronze

== See also ==
- Greece at the IAAF World Championships in Athletics
- Greece at the IAAF World Indoor Championships in Athletics
- Greece at the European Athletics Indoor Championships
