= Greece at the 2022 European Athletics Championships =

- WA code: GRE
- National federation: Hellenic Athletic Federation
- Website: www.segas.gr/index.php/el/

in (Germany) Munich
- Competitors: 40 (15 men and 25 women) in 24 events
- Medals Ranked 4th: Gold 4 Silver 1 Bronze 0 Total 5

European Athletics Championships appearances (overview)
- 1934; 1938; 1946; 1950; 1954; 1958; 1962; 1966; 1969; 1971; 1974; 1978; 1982; 1986; 1990; 1994; 1998; 2002; 2006; 2010; 2012; 2014; 2016; 2018; 2022; 2024

Greece competed at the 2022 European Athletics Championships in Munich, Germany, between 15 and 21 August 2022 with 40 athletes.

== Medals ==
Medal	Name	Event	Date	Notes
Gold	Antigoni Drisbioti	Women's 35 km walk	16 August	
Gold	Miltiadis Tentoglou	Men's Long Jump	16 August	CR
Gold	Antigoni Drisbioti	Women's 20 km walk	20 August	PB
Gold	Elina Tzengko	Javelin throw	20 August	PB
Silver	Katerina Stefanidi	Women's Pole Vault	17 August	SB

== Results ==
=== Men ===
Track & road events

Athlete	Event	Heat		Semifinal		Final	
Athlete	Event	Result	Rank	Result	Rank	Result	Rank
Panagiotis Trivyzas	200 m	21.00	19	did not advance			
Konstadinos Zikos; Ioannis Nyfantopoulos; Panagiotis Trivyzas; Theodoros Vrontinos	4 × 100 m relay	39.11	10	—N/a		did not advance	
Alexandros Papamichail	35 km walk	—N/a				DNF	

Field events

Athlete	Event	Qualification		Final	
Athlete	Event	Distance	Rank	Distance	Rank
Antonios Merlos	High jump	2.17	14	did not advance	
Emmanouil Karalis	Pole vault	5.50	13	did not advance	
Miltiadis Tentoglou	Long jump	7.94	2 q	8.52 CR	1st place, gold medalist(s)
Dimitrios Tsiamis	Triple jump	15.99	15	did not advance	
Andreas Pantazis	Triple jump	15.86	18	did not advance	
Nikolaos Andrikopoulos	Triple jump	15.39	19	did not advance	
Mihail Anastasakis	Hammer throw	70.84	did not advance		
Christos Frantzeskakis	Hammer throw	76.33	8 q	78.20 PB	6

=== Women ===
Track & road events

Athlete	Event	Heat		Semifinal		Final	
Athlete	Event	Result	Rank	Result	Rank	Result	Rank
Rafailía Spanoudaki-Hatziriga	100 m	11.62	19	did not advance			
Artemis Anastasiou	200 m	23.38	13 Q	23.60	19	did not advance	
Elisavet Pesiridou	100 m hurdles	13.33	9 Q	13.19	17	did not advance	
Dimitra Gnafaki	400 m hurdles	56.45 PB	6 Q	56.14 PB	13	did not advance	
Styliani-Alexandra Michailidou; Elisavet Pesiridou; Artemis Melina Anastasiou; Rafailía Spanoudaki-Hatziriga	4 × 100 m relay	44.58	13	—N/a		did not advance	
Korina Politi; Andrianna Ferra; Despoina Mourta; Dimitra Gnafaki	4 × 400 m relay	3.33.33 SB	14	—N/a		did not advance	
Kiriaki Filtisakou	35 km walk	—N/a				did not finish	
Efstathia Kourkoutsaki	35 km walk	—N/a				3:07:42	16
Antigoni Drisbioti	35 km walk	—N/a				2:47:00 CR	1st place, gold medalist(s)
Antigoni Drisbioti	20 km walk	—N/a				1:29:03 PB	1st place, gold medalist(s)
Christina Papadopoulou	20 km walk	—N/a				1:35:19 SB	12

Field events

Athlete	Event	Qualification		Final	
Athlete	Event	Distance	Rank	Distance	Rank
Katerina Stefanidi	Pole vault	4.50	2 q	4.75 SB	2nd place, silver medalist(s)
Eleni-Klaoudia Polak	Pole vault	4.40	17	did not advance	
Tatiana Gousin	High jump	1.87	5 q	1.86	9
Vasiliki Chaitidou	Long jump	6.32	16	did not advance	
Spyridoula Karydi	Triple jump	13.71	12 q	13.54	9
Stamatia Skarvelis	Hammer throw	67.13	17	did not advance	
Hrisoula Anagnostopoulou	Discus throw	58.13	10 q	56.10	12
Elina Tzengko	Javelin throw	61.28	2 Q	65.81 PB	1st place, gold medalist(s)

Key

- Q = Qualified for the next round
- q = Qualified for the next round as a fastest loser or, in field events, by position without achieving the qualifying target
- NR = National record
- N/A = Round not applicable for the event
- Bye = Athlete not required to compete in round
