= Greece at the 2010 European Athletics Championships =

- WA code: GRE
- National federation: Hellenic Athletics Federation
- Website: www.segas.gr/index.php/el/

in (Spain) Barcelona
- Competitors: 33
- Medals: Gold 0 Silver 0 Bronze 0 Total 0

European Athletics Championships appearances (overview)
- 1934; 1938; 1946; 1950; 1954; 1958; 1962; 1966; 1969; 1971; 1974; 1978; 1982; 1986; 1990; 1994; 1998; 2002; 2006; 2010; 2012; 2014; 2016; 2018; 2022; 2024; 2026

Greece was represented by 33 athletes at the 2010 European Athletics Championships held in Barcelona, Spain. The Greek team did not win a medal at the championships, for the first time in two decades, after the 1990 European Athletics Championships in Split, Yugoslavia.

== Participants ==
Event	Men	Women	Place	Notes
100 m		Georgia Kokloni		
200 m	Lykourgos-Stefanos Sakonas		7th	20.90 sec
400 m	Dimitrios Gravalos; Petros Kyriakidis	Agni Derveni		
800 m		Eleni Filandra		
10000 m		Konstantina Kefala		
110 m hurdles	Konstadinos Douvalidis			
400 m hurdles	Periklis Iakovakis; Sotirios Iakovakis; Spyridon Papadopoulos		5th	49.38 sec
3000 st.		Irini Kokkinariou		
High Jump	Konstadinos Baniotis 8th	Antonia Stergiou	8th	1.92 m
Pole Vault	Konstadinos Filippidis	Nikolia Kyriakopoulou; Afroditi Skafida	13th	
Long Jump	Savvas Diakonikolas; Michail Mertzanidis-Despoteris; Georgios Tsakonas; Louis Tsatoumas		6th	8.09 m
Triple Jump	Nikolaos Frangos; Dimitrios Tsiamis	Athanasia Perra	10th	
Shot Put	Michail Stamatogiannis			
Hammer Throw		Alexandra Papageorgiou	14th	
Javelin Throw	Spiridon Lebesis; Ioannis Smalios	Savva Lika		
Heptathlon		Sofia Ifadidou; Argyro Strataki	15th	
4x400 m relay	Dimitrios Gravalos; Sotirios Iakovakis; Petros Kyriakidis; Georgios Oikonomidis; Pantelis Melachroinoudis		10th	
