= Greece at the 2012 European Athletics Championships =

- WA code: GRE
- National federation: Hellenic Athletics Federation
- Website: www.segas.gr/index.php/el/

in (Finland) Helsinki
- Competitors: 24
- Medals Ranked 26th: Gold 0 Silver 0 Bronze 1 Total 1

European Athletics Championships appearances (overview)
- 1934; 1938; 1946; 1950; 1954; 1958; 1962; 1966; 1969; 1971; 1974; 1978; 1982; 1986; 1990; 1994; 1998; 2002; 2006; 2010; 2012; 2014; 2016; 2018; 2022; 2024

Greece was represented by 24 athletes at the 2012 European Athletics Championships held in Helsinki, Finland, from 26 June 2012 until 1 July 2012.

== Medals ==
Medal	Name	Event	Date
Bronze	Nikoleta Kyriakopoulou	Women's pole vault	30 June

== Results ==
=== Men ===
Track

Event	Athletes	Heats		Semifinal		Final	
Event	Athletes	Result	Rank	Result	Rank	Result	Rank
200 m	Lykourgos-Stefanos Tsakonas	20.73	2 Q	Disqualified		did not advance	
800 m	Andréas Dimitrákis	1:49.88	32	did not advance			
110 m hurdles	Konstadinos Douvalidis	13.57	7 Q	13.37	3 Q NR	13.59	8
400 m hurdles	Periklis Iakovakis	50.25	6 Q	49.83	8 Q	50.57	8
400 m hurdles	Spirídon Papadópoulos	51.01	22 q	51.89	23	did not advance	

Field

Event	Athletes	Qualification		Final	
Event	Athletes	Result	Rank	Result	Rank
Long jump	Dimítrios Diamantáras	7.81	14	did not advance	
Long jump	Yeóryios Tsákonas	7.64	25	did not advance	
Triple jump	Dimitrios Tsiamis	16.55	10 q	16.52	9
High jump	Konstadinos Baniotis	2.19	16	did not advance	
Pole vault	Konstadinos Filippidis	5.50	7 q	5.72	5
Shot put	Michalis Stamatogiannis	18.95	18	did not advance	
Discus throw	Yeóryios Trémos	56.94	28	did not advance	
Javelin throw	Yervásios Filippídis	72.39	24	did not advance	

=== Women ===
Track

Event	Athletes	Heats		Semifinal		Final	
Event	Athletes	Result	Rank	Result	Rank	Result	Rank
100 m	Maria Belibasaki	11.56	20	did not advance			
200 m	Maria Belibasaki	23.55	17 Q	23.31	10	did not advance	
800 m	Eleni Filandra	2:02.37	7	—N/a		did not advance	

Field

Event	Athletes	Qualification		Final	
Event	Athletes	Result	Rank	Result	Rank
Triple jump	Niki Paneta	14.08	12 q	14.23	6
Triple jump	Paraskevi Papachristou	14.35	5 Q	13.89	11
Triple jump	Athanasia Perra	14.22	7 Q	14.23	7
High jump	Antonia Stergiou	1.87	12 q	1.80	11
Pole vault	Nikoleta Kyriakopoulou	4.40	5 q	4.60	3rd place, bronze medalist(s)
Pole vault	Stella-Iro Ledaki	4.35	13	did not advance	
Pole vault	Katerina Stefanidi	4.40	5 q	No mark	—
Javelin throw	Savva Lika	57.60	8 q	56.25	9

Combined

Heptathlon	Event	Sofía Ifadídou		
Heptathlon	Event	Results	Points	Rank
	100 m hurdles	13.82	1004	10
	High jump	1.65	795	17
	Shot Put	12.65	704	13
	200 m	25.62	831	16
	Long jump	5.52	706	17
	Javelin throw	DNS		
	800 m	DNS		
Final			DNF	
