= Greek Athletics Championships =

National sports competition

- Sport: Track and field
- Founded: 1896
- Country: Greece

The Greek Athletics Championships (Greek: Πανελλήνιο πρωτάθλημα στίβου) is an annual outdoor track and field competition organised by the Hellenic Amateur Athletic Association, which serves as the national championship for the sport in Greece.

The event was first held in 1896 and events for women were added to the schedule in 1930. The men's and women's championships have been organised both as separate competitions, and at the same venue. Separate annual championship events are held for road running and racewalking events. There is also a Greek Indoor Athletics Championships.

== Events ==
The competition programme features a total of 38 individual Greek Championship athletics events, 19 for men and 19 for women. For each of the sexes, there are seven track running events, three obstacle events, four jumps, four throws, and one combined track and field event.

Track running

- 100 metres, 200 metres, 400 metres, 800 metres, 1500 metres, 5000 metres, 10,000 metres

Obstacle events

- 100 metres hurdles (women only), 110 metres hurdles (men only), 400 metres hurdles, 3000 metres steeplechase

Jumping events

- Pole vault, high jump, long jump, triple jump

Throwing events

- Shot put, discus throw, javelin throw, hammer throw

Combined events

- Decathlon (men only), Heptathlon (women only)

The women's programme gradually expanded to match the men's. On the track, the 1500 m was added in 1969, the 3000 metres in 1977 and the 10,000 metres in 1988. The 3000 m was replaced by the international standard 5000 m in 1995. Similarly, the women's pentathlon was replaced by the heptathlon in 1982. The 80 metres hurdles was contested until 1968, after which the international standard distance of 100 m hurdles was used. A 400 m hurdles event was introduced in 1976. The women's field events reached parity with the men's after the addition of triple jump in 1992, and hammer throw and pole vault in 1995. From the period 1986–98 women had a 10,000 metres race walking championship. The women's steeplechase was the last event to be added to the schedule, with women first competing in a national championship event in 2001.

== Championship records ==
=== Men ===
Event	Record	Athlete/Team	Date	Place	Ref.
100 m	10.13	Angelos Pavlakakis	8 July 2000	Marousi	
200 m	20.18	Konstantinos Kenteris	15 June 2022	Trikala	
Long jump	8.66 m (+1.0 m/s) =NR	Miltiadis Tentoglou	26 July 2026	Volos	
Pole vault	6.08 m NR	Emmanouil Karalis	2 August 2025	Volos	

=== Women ===
Event	Record	Athlete/Team	Date	Place	Ref.
100 m	10.93	Katerina Thanou	9 July 2000	Marousi	
200 m	22.98	Maria Belibasaki	15 July 2018	Patras	
Long jump	6.83 m PB	Chrisopigi Devetzi	10 June 2006	Trikala	
Pole vault	4.83 m	Katerina Stefanidi	29 July 2019	Patras	
