= Greece at the 1990 European Athletics Championships =

- WA code: GRE
- National federation: Hellenic Athletics Federation
- Website: www.segas.gr/index.php/el/

in (Socialist Federal Republic of Yugoslavia) Split
- Competitors: 11
- Medals: Gold 0 Silver 0 Bronze 0 Total 0

European Athletics Championships appearances (overview)
- 1934; 1938; 1946; 1950; 1954; 1958; 1962; 1966; 1969; 1971; 1974; 1978; 1982; 1986; 1990; 1994; 1998; 2002; 2006; 2010; 2012; 2014; 2016; 2018; 2022; 2024; 2026

Greece was represented by 11 athletes at the 1990 European Athletics Championships held in Split, Yugoslavia.

== Results ==
Name	Event	Place	Notes
Anna Verouli	Women's javelin throw	8th	59.32 m
Konstantinos Koukodimos	Men's long jump	10th	7.79 m
