= Greece at the 1998 European Athletics Championships =

- WA code: GRE
- National federation: Hellenic Athletics Federation
- Website: www.segas.gr/index.php/el/

in (Hungary) Budapest
- Competitors: 48
- Medals Ranked 14th: Gold 1 Silver 0 Bronze 2 Total 3

European Athletics Championships appearances (overview)
- 1934; 1938; 1946; 1950; 1954; 1958; 1962; 1966; 1969; 1971; 1974; 1978; 1982; 1986; 1990; 1994; 1998; 2002; 2006; 2010; 2012; 2014; 2016; 2018; 2022; 2024; 2026

Greece participated with 48 athletes at the 1998 European Athletics Championships held in Budapest, Hungary.

== Medals ==
Medal	Name	Event	Notes
Gold	Olga Vasdeki	Women's triple jump	14.55 m
Bronze	Ekaterini Thanou	Women's 100 metres	10.87 s
Bronze	Haralabos Papadias	Men's 100 metres	10.17

== Results ==
Name	Event	Place	Notes
Alexandros Yenovelis; Alexios Alexopoulos; Georgios Panagiotopoulos; Haralabos Papadias	Men's 4 x 100 m relay	4th	39.07 sec
Maria Tsoni; Ekaterini Koffa; Panayiota Koutrouli; Ekaterini Thanou	Women's 4 x 100 m relay	5th	44.01 sec
Dimitrios Kokotis	Men's high jump	5th	2.30 m
Ekaterini Voggoli	Women's discus throw	5th	63.56 m
Hristos Polihroniou	Men's hammer throw	6th	77.97 m
Anastasia Kelesidou	Women's discus throw	7th	62.95 m
Paraskevi Tsiamita	Women's triple jump	9th	13.90 m
Niki Bakoyianni	Women's high jump	9th	1.89 m
Konstantinos Koukodimos	Men's long jump	10th	7.77 m
