= Greece at the World Athletics Indoor Championships =

Greece at the World Indoor Championships in Athletics
- WA code: GRE
- National federation: Hellenic Amateur Athletic Association
- Website: www.cbat.org.br
- Medals Ranked 23rd: Gold 7 Silver 4 Bronze 6 Total 17

World Indoor Championships in Athletics appearances
- 1987; 1989; 1991; 1993; 1995; 1997; 1999; 2001; 2003; 2004; 2006; 2008; 2010; 2012; 2014; 2016; 2018; 2022; 2024

Greece (GRE) has competed at the IAAF World Indoor Championships in Athletics. As of 2024 Greek athletes have won a total of 17 medals.

== Summary ==
Championships	Athletes	Gold	Silver	Bronze	Total	Rank
1987 Indianapolis	3	0	0	0	0	-
1989 Budapest	4	0	0	0	0	-
1991 Seville	4	0	0	0	0	-
1993 Toronto	7	0	0	0	0	-
1995 Barcelona	14	0	1	0	1	23rd
1997 Paris	14	2	1	0	3	5th
1999 Maebashi	8	1	0	0	1	12th
2001 Lisbon	10	0	0	0	0	-
2003 Birmingham	10	0	0	0	0	-
2004 Budapest	19	0	0	2	2	23rd
2006 Moscow	4	0	0	0	0	-
2008 Valencia	5	0	~~1~~	0	0	-
2010 Doha	7	0	0	0	0	-
2012 Istanbul	7	1	0	0	1	11th
2014 Sopot	5	1	0	0	1	14th
2016 Portland	6	0	0	2	2	25th
2018 Birmingham	9	0	0	1	1	24th
2022 Belgrade	7	1	0	0	1	14th
2024 Glasgow	9	1	0	1	2	8th
2025 Nanjing	5	0	1	0	1	19th
2026 Torun	7	0	1	0	1	19th
2028 Bhubaneswar	-	-	-	-	-	future event
Total		7	4	6	17	23rd

== Championships ==
=== 1995 ===
Name	Event	Place	Notes
Lambros Papakostas	Men's high jump	Silver	2.35 m NR

=== 1997 ===
Greece competed with 14 athletes at the 1997 IAAF World Indoor Championships in Paris, France, from March 7 to March 9, 1997.

Name	Event	Place	Notes
Haralabos Papadias	Men's 60 m	Gold	6.50 s NR
Ekaterini Koffa	Women's 200 m	Gold	22.76 s NR
Lambros Papakostas	Men's high jump	Silver	2.32 m
Niki Xanthou	Women's long jump	5th	6.69 m
Spyridon Vasdekis	Men's long jump	8th	7.99 m
Ekaterini Thanou	Women's 60 metres	7th	7.15 s NR (sf)

=== 1999 ===
Greece competed with 8 athletes at the 1999 IAAF World Indoor Championships in Maebashi, Japan from March 5 to March 7, 1999.

Name	Event	Place	Notes
Ekaterini Thanou	Women's 60 metres	Gold	6.96 s NR, WL
Niki Xanthou	Women's long jump	4th	6.65 m
Paraskevi Tsiamita	Women's triple jump	5th	14.63 m NR
Alexios Alexopoulos	Men's 200 metres	7th	20.98 s (sf)
Georgios Theodoridis	Men's 60 metres	9th	6.58 s (sf)

=== 2001 ===
Greece competed with 10 athletes at the 2001 IAAF World Indoor Championships in Lisbon, Portugal.

Name	Event	Place	Notes
Georgios Theodoridis	Men's 60 metres	7th	6.60 s
Angelos Pavlakakis	Men's 60 metres	10th	6.63 s (sf)

=== 2003 ===
Greece competed with 10 athletes at the 2003 IAAF World Indoor Championships in Birmingham, UK.

Name	Event	Place	Notes
Niki Xanthou	Women's long jump	5th	6.47m
Styliani Pilatou	Women's long jump	6th	6.47m
Georgios Theodoridis	Men's 60 metres	13th	6.68 s (sf)

=== 2004 ===
Greece competed with 19 athletes at the 2004 IAAF World Indoor Championships in Budapest, Hungary between March 5 and March 7, 2004.

Name	Event	Place	Notes
Hrysopiyi Devetzi	Women's triple jump	Bronze	14.73 m
Georgios Theodoridis	Men's 60 m	Bronze	6.54 s (SB)
Fani Chalkia	Women's 400 metres	6th	52.90 s
Fani Chalkia; Yeoryía Koumnaki; Hrisoula Goudenoudi; Eleftheria Papadopoulou	Women's 4 × 400 metres relay	6th	3:39.23 s
Flora Redoumi	Women's 60 metres hurdles	7th	7.94 s
Yeoryia Tsiliggiri	Women's pole vault	10th (q)	4.30 m (SB)
Yeoryia Kokloni	Women's 60 metres	16th (sf)	7.33 s

=== 2006 ===
Greece competed with 4 athletes at the 2006 IAAF World Indoor Championships in Moscow, Russia.

Name	Event	Place	Notes
Louis Tsatoumas	Men's long jump	4th	8.10m
Styliani Pilatou	Women's long jump	7th	6.50m
Dimitris Tsiamis	Men's triple jump	8th	16.94m

=== 2008 ===
Greece competed with 5 athletes at the 2008 IAAF World Indoor Championships in Valencia, Spain between March 7 and March 9, 2008.

Name	Event	Place	Notes
~~Hrysopiyi Devetzi~~	Women's triple jump	~~Silver~~	~~15.00 m NR~~ DSQ
Louis Tsatoumas	Men's long jump	10th	7.77 m (sf)

=== 2010 ===
Greece competed at the 2012 IAAF World Indoor Championships in Doha, Qatar.

Name	Event	Place	Notes
Konstantinos Filippidis	Men's pole vault	4th	5.65 m
Dimitris Tsiamis	Men's triple jump	11th	16.53 m (q)

=== 2012 ===
Greece competed with 7 athletes at the 2012 IAAF World Indoor Championships in Istanbul, Turkey between March 9 and March 12, 2012.

Name	Event	Place	Notes
Dimitrios Chondrokoukis	Men's high jump	Gold	2.33 m PB
Konstadinos Baniotis	Men's high jump	4th	2.31 m SB
Louis Tsatoumas	Men's long jump	6th	7.88 m
Konstantinos Filippidis	Men's pole vault	7th	5.70 m

=== 2014 ===
Greece competed with 5 athletes at the 2014 IAAF World Indoor Championships in Sopot, Poland between March 7 and March 9, 2014.

Name	Event	Place	Notes
Konstantinos Filippidis	Men's pole vault	Gold	5.80 m
Louis Tsatoumas	Men's long jump	4th	8.13 m
Konstadinos Douvalidis	Men's 60 metres hurdles	9th	7.62 s
Nikoleta Kyriakopoulou	Women's pole vault	12th	4.30 m

=== 2016 ===
Greece competed with 6 athletes at the 2016 IAAF World Indoor Championships in Portland, United States between March 17 and March 20, 2016. Paraskevi Papachristou won her first medal in a major competition, while Katerina Stefanidi was third (behind Suhr and Morris), before starting her series of gold medals (European Outdoor Championships, Olympic Games, European Indoor and World Outdoor Championships).

Name	Event	Rank	Result
Katerina Stefanidi	Women's pole vault	(bronze) Bronze	4.80 m
Paraskevi Papachristou	Women's triple jump	(bronze) Bronze	14.15 m
Konstadinos Baniotis	Men's high jump	5th	2.29 m
Nikoleta Kyriakopoulou	Women's pole vault	6th	4.60 m
Konstadinos Filippidis	Men's pole vault	7th	5.65 m
Konstadinos Douvalidis	Men's 60 metres hurdles	15th	7.79 s

=== 2018 ===
Greece competed at the 2018 IAAF World Indoor Championships in Birmingham, United Kingdom, from 1–4 March 2018. A team of 9 athletes, 4 men and 5 women, represented the country in a total of 8 events.

Name	Event	Rank	Result
Katerina Stefanidi	Women's pole vault	(bronze) Bronze	4.80 m
Emmanouíl Karalis	Men's pole vault	5th	5.80 m PB
Paraskevi Papachristou	Women's triple jump	6th	14.05 m
Konstadinos Filippidis	Men's pole vault	7th	5.70 m
Miltiadis Tentoglou	Men's long jump	9th	7.82 m
Konstadinos Douvalidis	Men's 60 metres hurdles	14th (semis)	7.68
Maria Belibasaki	Women's 400 metres	DSQ (semis)	52.27 PB in qualifying
Rafailía Spanoudaki-Hatziriga	Women's 60 metres	35th (q)	7.40
Elisavet Pesiridou	Women's 60 metres hurdles	DNF	

=== 2022 ===
Greece competed at the 2022 World Athletics Indoor Championships in Belgrade, Serbia, from 18–20 March 2022. A team of 6 athletes, 3 men and 3 women, represented the country in a total of 6 events.

Name	Event	Rank	Result
Miltiadis Tentoglou	Men's long jump	Gold	8.55m NR
Nikolaos Andrikopoulos	Men's triple jump	12th	16.05m
Irini Vasiliou	Women's 400 metres	25th (h)	53.62 s SB
Konstadinos Douvalidis	Men's 60 metres hurdles	31st (h)	7.77 s SB
Rafailía Spanoudaki-Hatziriga	Women's 60 metres	32nd (h)	7.35 s
Elisavet Pesiridou	Women's 60 metres hurdles	36th (h)	8.30 s

=== 2024 ===
Greece competed at the 2024 World Athletics Indoor Championships in Glasgow, United Kingdom, from 1–3 March 2024. A team of 9 athletes, 5 men and 4 women, represented the country in a total of 9 events.

Name	Event	Rank	Result
Miltiadis Tentoglou	Men's long jump	Gold	8.22m
Emmanouil Karalis	Men's pole vault	(bronze) Bronze	5.85 m, SB
Tatiana Gusin	Women's high jump	7th	1.88m
Katerina Stefanidi	Women's pole vault	7th	4.55m

=== 2025 ===
Greece competed at the 2025 World Athletics Indoor Championships in Nanjing, China, 21–23 March 2025. A team of 5 athletes, 2 men and 3 women, represented the country in a total of 4 events.

Name	Event	Rank	Result
Emmanouil Karalis	Men's pole vault	(silver) Silver	6.05 m NR
Miltiadis Tentoglou	Men's long jump	5th	8.14m SB
Polyniki Emmanouilidou	Women's 60 metres	20th (sf)	7.33s (heats: 7.28s)

=== 2026 ===
Greece competed at the 2026 World Athletics Indoor Championships in Torun, Poland, 20–22 March 2026. A team of 7 athletes (5 men, 2 women) represented the country in a total of 7 events.

Name	Event	Rank	Result
Emmanouil Karalis	Men's pole vault	(silver) Silver	6.05 m
Miltiadis Tentoglou	Men's long jump	6th	8.19 m
Antonios Merlos	Men's high jump	8th	2.22 m
Anastasia Dragomirova	Women's pentathlon	11th	4.120 p
Rafaéla Spanoudaki-Hatziriga	Women's 60 m	36th	7.36 s (h)

== Medalists ==
Name	Championships	Event	Medal
Miltiadis Tentoglou	2022 Belgrade	Men's long jump	Gold
Miltiadis Tentoglou	2024 Glasgow	Men's long jump	Gold
Haralambos Papadias	1997 Paris	Men's 60m	Gold
Ekaterini Koffa	1997 Paris	Women's 200m	Gold
Ekaterini Thanou	1999 Maebashi	Women's 60m	Gold
Dimitrios Chondrokoukis	2012 Istanbul	Men's high jump	Gold
Konstadinos Filippidis	2014 Sopot	Men's pole vault	Gold
Emmanouil Karalis	2025 Nanjing	Men's pole vault	Silver
Emmanouil Karalis	2026 Torun	Men's pole vault	Silver
Emmanouil Karalis	2024 Glasgow	Men's pole vault	Bronze
Lambros Papakostas	1995 Barcelona	Men's high jump	Silver
Lambros Papakostas	1997 Paris	Men's high jump	Silver
Ekaterini Stefanidi	2018 Birmingham	Women's pole vault	Bronze
Ekaterini Stefanidi	2016 Portland	Women's pole vault	Bronze
Georgios Theodoridis	2004 Budapest	Men's 60 m	Bronze
Hrysopiyi Devetzi	2004 Budapest	Women's triple jump	Bronze
Paraskevi Papachristou	2016 Portland	Women's triple jump	Bronze

== See also ==
- Greece at the IAAF World Championships in Athletics
- Greece at the European Athletics Indoor Championships
- Greece at the European Athletics Championships
