= Greece at the 1966 European Athletics Championships =

- WA code: GRE
- National federation: Hellenic Athletics Federation
- Website: www.segas.gr/index.php/el/

in Budapest
- Competitors: 15
- Medals Ranked 13th: Gold 0 Silver 1 Bronze 0 Total 1

European Athletics Championships appearances (overview)
- 1934; 1938; 1946; 1950; 1954; 1958; 1962; 1966; 1969; 1971; 1974; 1978; 1982; 1986; 1990; 1994; 1998; 2002; 2006; 2010; 2012; 2014; 2016; 2018; 2022; 2024; 2026

Greece was represented by 15 athletes at the 1966 European Athletics Championships held in Budapest, Hungary.

== Medals ==
Medal	Name	Event
Silver	Christos Papanikolaou	Men's pole vault
