= Greece at the 2017 European Athletics Indoor Championships =

- WA code: GRE
- National federation: Hellenic Athletic Federation
- Website: www.segas.gr/index.php/el/

in (Serbia) Belgrade
- Competitors: 7 in 6 events
- Medals Ranked 7th: Gold 1 Silver 1 Bronze 1 Total 3

European Athletics Indoor Championships appearances (overview)
- 1966; 1967; 1968; 1969; 1970; 1971; 1972; 1973; 1974; 1975; 1976; 1977; 1978; 1979; 1980; 1981; 1982; 1983; 1984; 1985; 1986; 1987; 1988; 1989; 1990; 1992; 1994; 1996; 1998; 2000; 2002; 2005; 2007; 2009; 2011; 2013; 2015; 2017; 2019; 2021; 2023

Greece competed at the 2017 European Athletics Indoor Championships in Belgrade, Serbia, from 3 to 5 March 2017 with a team of 7 athletes (3 men and 4 women) in six events.

== Medals ==
Name	Event	Medal	Notes
Ekaterini Stefanidi	Women's pole vault	Gold	4.85 m WL
Konstadinos Filippidis	Men's pole vault	Silver	5.85 m NR
Paraskevi Papachristou	Women's triple jump	Bronze	14.24 m SB

== Results ==
Name	Event	Place	Notes
Elisavet Pesiridou	Women's 60 m hurdles	9th	8.10 s
Emmanouil Karalis	Men's pole vault	11th	5.50 m

== See also ==
- Greece at the European Athletics Indoor Championships
