= Greece at the 2024 European Athletics Championships =

- Flag of Greece
- WA code: GRE

in Rome, Italy 7 June 2024 – 12 June 2022
- Competitors: 53 (28 men and 25 women)
- Medals Ranked 13th: Gold 1 Silver 2 Bronze 0 Total 3

European Athletics Championships appearances (overview)
- 1934; 1938; 1946; 1950; 1954; 1958; 1962; 1966; 1969; 1971; 1974; 1978; 1982; 1986; 1990; 1994; 1998; 2002; 2006; 2010; 2012; 2014; 2016; 2018; 2022; 2024

Greece competed at the 2024 European Athletics Championships in Rome, Italy from 7–12 June 2024.

== Medals ==
Medal	Name	Event	Date	Notes
Gold	Miltiadis Tentoglou	Men's long jump	9 June	8.65m, CR PB
Silver	Katerina Stefanidi	Women's pole vault	10 June	4.73m, SB
Silver	Emmanouil Karalis	Men's pole vault	12 June	5.87m, PB

== Results ==
Greece entered the following athletes.

Key

- Q = Qualified for the next round
- q = Qualified for the next round as a fastest loser or, in field events, by position without achieving the qualifying target

=== Men ===
Track and road events

Athlete	Event	Heat		Semifinal		Final	
Athlete	Event	Result	Rank	Result	Rank	Result	Rank
Ioannis Nyfantopoulos	100 metres	10.40	17	did not advance			
Sotirios Gkaragkanis	200 metres	20.91	10 q	20.93	21	did not advance	
Ioannis Kariofyllis	200 metres	21.00	16	did not advance			
Marios Anagnostou	10,000 metres	—N/a				31:53.73	42
Konstantinos Stamoulis	10,000 metres	—N/a				30:09.67	39
Nikolaos Stamoulis	10,000 metres	—N/a				30:42.47	40
Panagiotis Karaiskos	Half marathon	—N/a				1:08:52	56
Konstantinos Douvalidis	110 metres hurdles	14.04	20	did not advance			
Dimitris Levantinos	400 metres hurdles	51.13	18	did not advance			
Alexandros Papamichail	20 kilometres walk	—N/a				DNF	
Vasileios Myrianthopoulos; Nikolaos Panagiotopoulos; Sotirios Gkaragkanis; Ioannis Nyfantopoulos	4 × 100 metres relay	39.13 SB	9	—N/a		39.39	7

Field events

Athlete	Event	Qualification		Final	
Athlete	Event	Distance	Position	Distance	Position
Antonios Merlos	High jump	2.17	14	did not advance	
Emmanouil Karalis	Pole vault	5.60	9 q	5.87 PB	2nd place, silver medalist(s)
Ioannis Rizos	Pole vault	NM		did not advance	
Miltiadis Tentoglou	Long jump	8.14	4 Q	8.65 PB CR	1st place, gold medalist(s)
Nikolaos Andrikopoulos	Triple jump	DNS		did not advance	
Andreas Pantazis	Triple jump	15.36	27	did not advance	
Dimitrios Tsiamis	Triple jump	16.33	15	did not advance	
Anastasios Latifllari	Shot put	16.83	28	did not advance	
Odysseas Mouzenidis	Shot put	18.84	23	did not advance	
Ioannis Kyriazis	Javelin throw	77.54	18	Did not advance	
Michail Anastasakis	Hammer throw	73.60	14	did not advance	
Christos Frantzeskakis	Hammer throw	73.11	18	did not advance	
Konstantinos Zaltos	Hammer throw	74.49	12 q	72.64	12

Combined events – Decathlon

Athlete	Event	100 m	LJ	SP	HJ	400 m	110H	DT	PV	JT	1500 m	Final	Rank
Angelos-Tzanis Andreoglou	Result	11.07	7.05	12.59	1.90	49.32 PB	14.78	39.69	4.60	51.56	4:28.86	7561	18
Angelos-Tzanis Andreoglou	Points	845	826	642	714	846	876	658	790	612	752	7561	18

=== Women ===
Track and road events

Athlete	Event	Heat		Semifinal		Final	
Athlete	Event	Result	Rank	Result	Rank	Result	Rank
Dimitra Tsoukala	100 metres	11.48	27	did not advance			
Polyniki Emmanouilidou	100 metres	11.21 =PB	3 q	11.21 =PB	11	did not advance	
Polyniki Emmanouilidou	200 metres	—N/a		22.84 PB	8 q	23.01	8
Artemis Melina Anastasiou	200 metres	23.52	16	did not advance			
Dafni-Eftychia-Tereza Lavasa	10,000 metres	—N/a				33:57.79	24
Anastasia Marinakou	10,000 metres	—N/a				32:42.34	16
Panagiota Vlachaki	Half marathon	—N/a				1:21:56	66
Elisavet Pesiridou	100 metres hurdles	13.32	14	did not advance			
Dimitra Gnafaki	400 metres hurdles	56.62 SB	16	did not advance			
Kyriaki Filtisakou	20 kilometres walk	—N/a				1:34:45	22
Antigoni Ntrismpioti	20 kilometres walk	—N/a				1:33:38 SB	16
Christina Papadopoulou	20 kilometres walk	—N/a				DQ	
Panagiota Tsinopoulou	20 kilometres walk	—N/a				1:34:12	19
Styliani-Alexandra Michailidou; Elisavet Pesiridou; Rafailia Spanoudaki-Chatziriga; Artemis Melina Anastasiou	4 × 100 metres relay	44.23	15	—N/a		Did not advance	

Field events

Athlete	Event	Qualification		Final	
Athlete	Event	Distance	Position	Distance	Position
Panagiota Dosi	High jump	1.81	28	did not advance	
Tatiana Gusin	High jump	1.89	14	did not advance	
Ariadni Adamopoulou	Pole vault	4.40	20	did not advance	
Eleni-Klaoudia Polak	Pole vault	4.40	16	did not advance	
Aikaterini Stefanidi	Pole vault	4.50	6 q	4.73 SB	2nd place, silver medalist(s)
Oxana Koreneva	Triple jump	13.86 SB	13	did not advance	
Maria Purtsa	Triple jump	13.69 SB	17	did not advance	
Maria Magkoulia	Shot put	15.31	23	did not advance	
Anastasia Ntragkomirova	Shot put	14.82	25	did not advance	
Elina Tzengko	Javelin throw	60.48 SB	4 q	59.46	6
Stamatia Scarvelis	Hammer throw	67.10	19	did not advance	
