= Greece at the 2006 European Athletics Championships =

- WA code: GRE
- National federation: Hellenic Athletics Federation
- Website: www.segas.gr/index.php/el/

in (Sweden) Gothenburg
- Competitors: 39
- Medals Ranked 13th: Gold 1 Silver 2 Bronze 0 Total 3

European Athletics Championships appearances (overview)
- 1934; 1938; 1946; 1950; 1954; 1958; 1962; 1966; 1969; 1971; 1974; 1978; 1982; 1986; 1990; 1994; 1998; 2002; 2006; 2010; 2012; 2014; 2016; 2018; 2022; 2024; 2026

Greece participated with 39 athletes (19 men, 20 women) at the 2006 European Athletics Championships held in Gothenburg, Sweden.

== Medals ==
Medal	Name	Event	Notes
Gold	Periklis Iakovakis	Men's 400 metres hurdles	48.46 s
Silver	Hrysopiyi Devetzi	Women's triple jump	15.04 m
Silver	Fani Halkia	Women's 400 metres hurdles	54.02 s

== Results ==
Name	Event	Place	Notes
Minas Alozidis	Men's 400 metres hurdles	7th	49.61 s
Dimitrios Regas	Men's 400 metres	8th	46.23 s
Anastasios Gousis	Men's 200 metres	8th	20.94 s
Louis Tsatoumas	Men's long jump	8th	7.84 m
Maria Protopappa	Women's 5000 metres	9th	15:22.13 SB
Argyro Strataki	Women's heptathlon	9th	6145
Alexandra Papayeoryiou	Women's hammer throw	9th	67.95 m
Georgia Kokloni	Women's 100 metres	9th (sf)	11.29 s PB
Georgia Kokloni; Hariklia Bouda; Efrosyni Patsou; Eleftheria Kobidou	Women's 4 × 100 metres relay	9th (sf)	44.20 s
Hrysopiyi Devetzi	Women's long jump	10th	6.41 m
