= Greece at the 1934 European Athletics Championships =

- WA code: GRE
- National federation: Hellenic Athletics Federation
- Website: www.segas.gr/index.php/el/

in Turin
- Competitors: 2
- Medals Ranked 13th: Gold 0 Silver 0 Bronze 1 Total 1

European Athletics Championships appearances (overview)
- 1934; 1938; 1946; 1950; 1954; 1958; 1962; 1966; 1969; 1971; 1974; 1978; 1982; 1986; 1990; 1994; 1998; 2002; 2006; 2010; 2012; 2014; 2016; 2018; 2022; 2024

Greece was represented by 2 athletes at the 1934 European Athletics Championships held in Turin, Italy.

== Medals ==
Medal	Name	Event
Bronze	Christos Mantikas	Men's 400 metres hurdles
