= Greece at the 2002 European Athletics Championships =

- WA code: GRE
- National federation: Hellenic Athletics Federation
- Website: www.segas.gr/index.php/el/

in (Germany) Munich
- Competitors: 51
- Medals Ranked 5th: Gold 4 Silver 0 Bronze 2 Total 6

European Athletics Championships appearances (overview)
- 1934; 1938; 1946; 1950; 1954; 1958; 1962; 1966; 1969; 1971; 1974; 1978; 1982; 1986; 1990; 1994; 1998; 2002; 2006; 2010; 2012; 2014; 2016; 2018; 2022; 2024

Greece was represented by (a record) of 51 athletes at the 2002 European Athletics Championships held in Munich, Germany.

== Medals ==
Medal	Name	Event	Notes
Gold	Ekaterini Thanou	Women's 100 metres	11.10
Gold	Konstantinos Kenteris	Men's 200 metres	19.85 NR, WL
Gold	Mirela Manjani	Women's javelin throw	67.47 m
Gold	Ekaterini Voggoli	Women's discus throw	64.31 m
Bronze	Anastasia Kelesidou	Women's discus throw	63.92 m
Bronze	Alexandros Papadimitriou	Men's hammer throw	80.21 m

== Results ==
Name	Event	Place	Notes
Periklis Iakovakis	Men's 400 metres hurdles	5th	49.07 s
Aggeliki Tsiolakoudi	Women's javelin throw	5th	63.24 m
Aristotelis Gavelas	Men's 100 metres	6th	10.36 s
Periklis Iakovakis; Stilianos Dimotsios; Anastasios Gousis; Georgios Ikonomidis	Men's 4 × 400 metres relay	6th	3:04.26
Stiliani Pilatou	Women's long jump	6th	6.58 m
Areti Abatzi	Women's discus throw	6th	61.49 m
Hrysopiyi Devetzi	Women's triple jump	7th	14.15 m
Alexandra Papayeoryiou	Women's hammer throw	7th	66.49 m
Konstadinos Zalagitis	Men's triple jump	8th	16.62 m
Dimitra Dova; Hariklia Bouda; Maria Papadopoulou; Hrisoula Goudenoudi	Women's 4 × 400 metres relay	8th	3:37.38
Athanasia Tsoumeleka	Women's 20 km walk	9th	1:31:25
