= 2011 European Athletics U23 Championships – Men's 200 metres =

The men's 200 metres at the 2011 European Athletics U23 Championships was held at the Městský stadion on 15 and 16 July.

== Medalists ==
Gold	Likoúrgos-Stéfanos Tsákonas; Greece (GRE)
Silver	(United Kingdom) James Alaka; Great Britain (GBR)
Bronze	Pavel Maslák; Czech Republic (CZE)

== Schedule ==
Date	Time	Round
15 July 2011	19:05	Round 1
16 July 2011	11:30	Semifinals
16 July 2011	18:05	Final

== Results ==
=== Round 1 ===
Qualification: First 3 in each heat (Q) and 4 best performers (q) advance to the Semifinals.

Rank	Heat	Name	Nationality	React	Time	Notes
1	4	Likoúrgos-Stéfanos Tsákonas	Greece	0.159	20.83	Q
2	3	Aliaksandr Linnik	Belarus	0.173	20.87	Q, SB
3	1	Steven Colvert	Ireland	0.166	20.95	Q, SB
4	2	Pavel Maslák	Czech Republic	0.164	20.99	Q
5	1	Izzet Safer	Turkey	0.164	21.03	Q
7	1	Petar Kremenski	Bulgaria	0.184	21.04	Q
7	4	David Dorail	France	0.171	21.04	Q
9	4	Davide Manenti	Italy	0.151	21.05	Q, SB
10	3	Alex Wilson	Switzerland	0.148	21.13	Q
11	3	James Alaka	Great Britain	0.195	21.25	Q
12	1	Iván Jesús Ramos	Spain	0.187	21.26	q
13	2	Daniel Talbot	Great Britain	0.220	21.29	Q
14	1	Alex Da Canal	Italy	0.176	21.34	q
15	3	Artur Zaczek	Poland	0.160	21.38	q
16	3	Mihaíl Dardaneliótis	Greece	0.148	21.42	q
17	2	Robin Erewa	Germany	0.136	21.52	Q
17	4	Sergio Ruiz	Spain	0.163	21.52	
19	2	Diego Marani	Italy	0.149	21.53	
20	4	Ruslan Perestyuk	Ukraine	0.154	21.54	
21	1	Hrvoje Udiljak	Croatia	0.157	21.56	
22	2	Roman Turcani	Slovakia	0.174	21.58	
23	3	Ben Bassaw	France	0.191	21.59	
24	2	Pascal Mancini	Switzerland	0.139	21.61	
25	2	Chris Russell	Ireland	0.146	21.63	
26	4	Alexander Nordkvist	Sweden	0.162	21.71	
27	3	Aivaras Pranckevičius	Lithuania	0.200	21.72	
28	1	Owen Camilleri	Malta	0.180	22.35	
29	1	Riste Ajdarov	Macedonia	0.147	22.49	
	4	Elvijs Misans	Latvia		DNS	

=== Semifinals ===
Qualification: First 3 in each heat (Q) and 2 best performers (q) advance to the Final.

Rank	Heat	Name	Nationality	React	Time	Notes
1	2	Likoúrgos-Stéfanos Tsákonas	Greece	0.160	20.57	Q, PB
2	1	James Alaka	Great Britain	0.165	20.59	Q, PB
3	1	Aliaksandr Linnik	Belarus	0.199	20.64	Q, NR
4	2	Pavel Maslák	Czech Republic	0.182	20.66	Q, PB
5	1	Alex Wilson	Switzerland	0.139	20.68	Q
6	2	Daniel Talbot	Great Britain	0.188	20.75	Q
7	1	Steven Colvert	Ireland	0.190	20.76	q, PB
8	2	Iván Jesús Ramos	Spain	0.166	20.89	q
9	2	Petar Kremenski	Bulgaria	0.194	20.98	
10	1	Davide Manenti	Italy	0.143	21.01	SB
11	2	Robin Erewa	Germany	0.151	21.10	
12	1	Mihaíl Dardaneliótis	Greece	0.158	21.26	
13	1	Artur Zaczek	Poland	0.179	21.30	SB
14	2	Alex Da Canal	Italy	0.171	21.40	
15	2	Izzet Safer	Turkey	0.182	21.41	
16	1	David Dorail	France	0.189	21.89	

=== Final ===
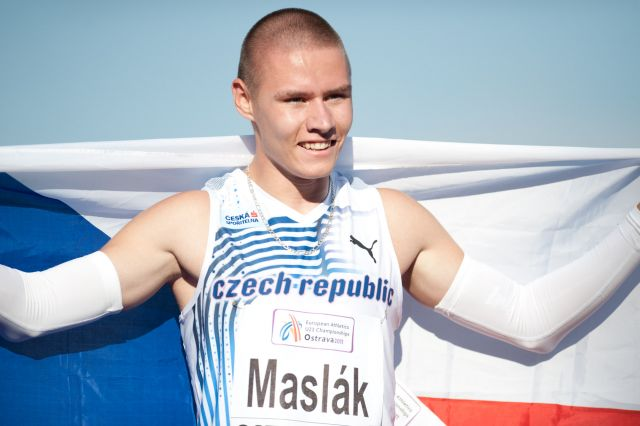
Bronze medalist Pavel Maslák after the final

Rank	Name	Nationality	React	Time	Notes
1st place, gold medalist(s)	Likoúrgos-Stéfanos Tsákonas	Greece	0.164	20.56	PB
2nd place, silver medalist(s)	James Alaka	Great Britain	0.143	20.66	
3rd place, bronze medalist(s)	Pavel Maslák	Czech Republic	0.170	20.67	
4	Daniel Talbot	Great Britain	0.178	20.71	
5	Aliaksandr Linnik	Belarus	0.161	20.81	
6	Steven Colvert	Ireland	0.187	21.03	
7	Alex Wilson	Switzerland	0.144	21.07	
8	Iván Jesús Ramos	Spain	0.181	21.11	

== Participation ==
According to an unofficial count, 28 athletes from 20 countries participated in the event.

- Belarus (1)
- Bulgaria (1)
- Croatia (1)
- Czech Republic (1)
- France (2)
- Germany (1)
- Greece (2)
- Ireland (2)
- Italy (3)
- Lithuania (1)
- North Macedonia (1)
- Malta (1)
- Poland (1)
- Slovakia (1)
- Spain (2)
- Sweden (1)
- Switzerland (1)
- Turkey (1)
- Ukraine (1)
- United Kingdom (2)
