= Greece at the 2013 European Athletics Indoor Championships =

- WA code: GRE
- National federation: Hellenic Athletic Federation
- Website: www.segas.gr/index.php/el/

in (Sweden) Gothenburg
- Competitors: 13
- Medals: Gold 0 Silver 0 Bronze 0 Total 0

European Athletics Indoor Championships appearances (overview)
- 1966; 1967; 1968; 1969; 1970; 1971; 1972; 1973; 1974; 1975; 1976; 1977; 1978; 1979; 1980; 1981; 1982; 1983; 1984; 1985; 1986; 1987; 1988; 1989; 1990; 1992; 1994; 1996; 1998; 2000; 2002; 2005; 2007; 2009; 2011; 2013; 2015; 2017; 2019; 2021; 2023

Greece competed at the 2013 European Athletics Indoor Championships in Gothenburg, Sweden, from 1-3 March 2013 with a team of 12 athletes.

== Results ==
Name	Event	Place	Notes
Konstantinos Filippidis	Men's pole vault	4th	5.76 m
Antonios Mastoras	Men's high jump	4th	2.29 m
Louis Tsatoumas	Men's long jump	5th	8.00 m
Konstantinos Douvalidis	Men's 60 m hurdles	7th	7.64
Konstantinos Baniotis	Men's high jump	9th	2.19 m
Nikoleta Kyriakopoulou	Women's pole vault	10th (q)	4.36 m
Ekaterini Stefanidi	Women's pole vault	13th (q)	4.36 m

== See also ==
Greece at the European Athletics Indoor Championships
