= Greece at the 2019 European Athletics Indoor Championships =

- WA code: GRE
- National federation: Hellenic Athletic Federation
- Website: www.segas.gr/index.php/el/

in (United Kingdom) Glasgow
- Competitors: 17 (10 men and 7 women) in 12 events
- Medals Ranked 6th: Gold 1 Silver 2 Bronze 1 Total 4

European Athletics Indoor Championships appearances (overview)
- 1966; 1967; 1968; 1969; 1970; 1971; 1972; 1973; 1974; 1975; 1976; 1977; 1978; 1979; 1980; 1981; 1982; 1983; 1984; 1985; 1986; 1987; 1988; 1989; 1990; 1992; 1994; 1996; 1998; 2000; 2002; 2005; 2007; 2009; 2011; 2013; 2015; 2017; 2019; 2021; 2023

Greece competed at the 2019 European Athletics Indoor Championships in Glasgow, Scotland, between 1 and 3 March 2019 with 17 athletes.

== Medals ==
Medal	Name	Event	Date	Notes
Gold	Miltiadis Tentoglou	Men's long jump	3 March	8.38 m NR
Silver	Konstadinos Baniotis	Men's high jump	2 March	2.26 m
Silver	Paraskevi Papahristou	Women's triple jump	3 March	14.50 m PB
Bronze	Nikoleta Kiriakopoulou	Women's pole vault	3 March	4.65 m

== Results ==
=== Men ===
Track & road events

Athlete	Event	Heat		Semifinal		Final	
Athlete	Event	Result	Rank	Result	Rank	Result	Rank
Konstantinos Zikos	60 m	6.66	1 Q	6.64	1 Q	6.67	5
Panagiotis Trivyzas	60 m	6.80	6	did not advance			
Efthimios Steryioulis	60 m	6.91	7	did not advance			
Andreas Dimitrakis	1500 m	3:50.94	8	did not advance			
Konstadinos Douvalidis	60 m hurdles	7.69 SB	2 Q	7.66 SB	3 Q	7.65 SB	5

Field Events

Athlete	Event	Qualification		Final	
Athlete	Event	Distance	Rank	Distance	Rank
Konstadinos Baniotis	High jump	2.25	8 q	2.26	2nd place, silver medalist(s)
Konstadinos Filippidis	Pole vault	5.60	8 q	NM	9
Emmanouil Karalis	Pole vault	5.70	1 q	5.65	4
Miltiadis Tentoglou	Long jump	8.01	2 Q	8.38 NR	1st place, gold medalist(s)
Nikolaos Skarvelis	Shot put	20.34 SB	7 q	20.13	8

=== Women ===
Track & road events

Athlete	Event	Heat		Semifinal		Final	
Athlete	Event	Result	Rank	Result	Rank	Result	Rank
Rafailía Spanoudaki-Hatziriga	60 m	DQ	–	did not advance			
Irini Vasiliou	400 m	53.66	5	did not advance			

Field Events

Athlete	Event	Qualification		Final	
Athlete	Event	Distance	Rank	Distance	Rank
Tatiana Gousin	High jump	1.85	23	did not advance	
Nikoleta Kiriakopoulou	Pole vault	4.60	7 q	4.65	3rd place, bronze medalist(s)
Katerina Stefanidi	Pole vault	4.60	1 q	4.65	4
Eleni Polak	Pole vault	4.50 =PB	12	did not advance	
Paraskevi Papahristou	Triple jump	14.28	3 Q	14.50 PB	2nd place, silver medalist(s)

Key

- Q = Qualified for the next round
- q = Qualified for the next round as a fastest loser or, in field events, by position without achieving the qualifying target
- NR = National record
- PB = Personal best
- SB = Season's best
- N/A = Round not applicable for the event
- Bye = Athlete not required to compete in round
