= Greece at the 2015 European Athletics Indoor Championships =

- WA code: GRE
- National federation: Hellenic Athletic Federation
- Website: www.segas.gr/index.php/el/

in (Czech Republic) Prague
- Competitors: 11
- Medals Ranked 18th: Gold 0 Silver 1 Bronze 1 Total 2

European Athletics Indoor Championships appearances (overview)
- 1966; 1967; 1968; 1969; 1970; 1971; 1972; 1973; 1974; 1975; 1976; 1977; 1978; 1979; 1980; 1981; 1982; 1983; 1984; 1985; 1986; 1987; 1988; 1989; 1990; 1992; 1994; 1996; 1998; 2000; 2002; 2005; 2007; 2009; 2011; 2013; 2015; 2017; 2019; 2021; 2023

Greece competed at the 2015 European Athletics Indoor Championships in Prague, Czech Republic, from 6 to 8 March 2015 with a team of 11 athletes.

== Medals ==
Name	Event	Medal	Notes
Ekaterini Stefanidi	Women's pole vault	Silver	4.75 m
Antonios Mastoras	Men's high jump	Silver	2.31 m PB

== Results ==
Name	Event	Place	Notes
Louis Tsatoumas	Men's long jump	4th	7.98 m
Konstantinos Filippidis	Men's pole vault	5th	5.75 m SB
Nikolia Kyriakopoulou	Women's pole vault	5th	4.50 m
Konstantinos Douvalidis	Men's 60 m hurdles	6th	7.64 s
Konstantinos Baniotis	Men's high jump	12th (q)	2.24 m

== See also ==
Greece at the European Athletics Indoor Championships
