= Greece at the 2021 European Athletics Indoor Championships =

- WA code: GRE
- National federation: Hellenic Athletic Federation
- Website: www.segas.gr/index.php/el/

in (Poland) Toruń
- Competitors: 19 (8 men and 11 women) in 13 events
- Medals Ranked 15th: Gold 1 Silver 0 Bronze 0 Total 1

European Athletics Indoor Championships appearances (overview)
- 1966; 1967; 1968; 1969; 1970; 1971; 1972; 1973; 1974; 1975; 1976; 1977; 1978; 1979; 1980; 1981; 1982; 1983; 1984; 1985; 1986; 1987; 1988; 1989; 1990; 1992; 1994; 1996; 1998; 2000; 2002; 2005; 2007; 2009; 2011; 2013; 2015; 2017; 2019; 2021; 2023

Greece competed at the 2021 European Athletics Indoor Championships in Toruń, Poland, between 4 and 7 March 2021 with 19 athletes.

== Medals ==
Medal	Name	Event	Date	Notes
Gold	Miltiadis Tentoglou	Men's long jump	5 March	8.35 m WL

== Results ==
Rank	Name	Event	Date	Notes
5th	Eleni-Klaoudia Polak	Women's pole vault	5 March	4.65 m
5th	Paraskevi Papachristou	Women's triple jump	7 March	14.31 m
7th	Dimitrios Tsiamis	Men's trimple jump	6 March	16.40 m
