= Greece at the 2023 European Athletics Indoor Championships =

- WA code: GRE
- National federation: Hellenic Athletic Federation
- Website: www.segas.gr/index.php/el/

in (Turkey) Istanbul
- Competitors: 19 (9 men and 10 women) in 13 events
- Medals Ranked 11th: Gold 1 Silver 2 Bronze 0 Total 3

European Athletics Indoor Championships appearances (overview)
- 1966; 1967; 1968; 1969; 1970; 1971; 1972; 1973; 1974; 1975; 1976; 1977; 1978; 1979; 1980; 1981; 1982; 1983; 1984; 1985; 1986; 1987; 1988; 1989; 1990; 1992; 1994; 1996; 1998; 2000; 2002; 2005; 2007; 2009; 2011; 2013; 2015; 2017; 2019; 2021; 2023

Greece competed at the 2023 European Athletics Indoor Championships in Istanbul, Turkey, between 2 and 5 March 2023 with 19 athletes.

== Medals ==
Medal	Name	Event	Date	Notes
Gold	Miltiadis Tentoglou	Men's long jump	5 March	8.30 m
Silver	Nikolaos Andrikopoulos	Men's triple jump	3 March	16.58 m SB
Silver	Emmanouil Karalis	Men's pole vault	5 March	5.80 m

== Results ==
Rank	Name	Event	Date	Notes
4th	Katerina Stefanidi	Women's pole vault	4 March	4.60 m
7th	Dimitrios Tsiamis	Men's triple jump	3 March	16.39 m
10th	Spyridoula Karydi	Women's triple jump	3 March	13.60 m SB (q)
12th	Andreas Pantazis	Men's triple jump	2 March	16.06 m (q)
