= Greece at the 1982 European Athletics Championships =

- WA code: GRE
- National federation: Hellenic Athletics Federation
- Website: www.segas.gr/index.php/el/

in (Greece) Athens
- Competitors: 29
- Medals Ranked 12th: Gold 1 Silver 0 Bronze 1 Total 2

European Athletics Championships appearances (overview)
- 1934; 1938; 1946; 1950; 1954; 1958; 1962; 1966; 1969; 1971; 1974; 1978; 1982; 1986; 1990; 1994; 1998; 2002; 2006; 2010; 2012; 2014; 2016; 2018; 2022; 2024

Greece hosted the 1982 European Athletics Championships in the Olympic Stadium of Athens, participating with a team of 29 athletes.

== Medals ==
Medal	Name	Event	Notes
Gold	Anna Verouli	Women's javelin throw	70.02 m CR
Bronze	Sofia Sakorafa	Women's javelin throw	67.04 m
