= Greece at the European Athletics Indoor Championships =

- WA code: GRE
- National federation: Hellenic Amateur Athletic Association
- Website: www.www.segas.gr
- Medals Ranked 26th: Gold 9 Silver 17 Bronze 12 Total 38

European Athletics Indoor Championships appearances (overview)
- 1966; 1967; 1968; 1969; 1970; 1971; 1972; 1973; 1974; 1975; 1976; 1977; 1978; 1979; 1980; 1981; 1982; 1983; 1984; 1985; 1986; 1987; 1988; 1989; 1990; 1992; 1994; 1996; 1998; 2000; 2002; 2005; 2007; 2009; 2011; 2013; 2015; 2017; 2019; 2021; 2023

Greece (GRE) has competed at the European Indoor Athletics Championships since the 1970 edition in Vienna, Austria. As of 2025, Greek athletes have won a total of 38 medals. Most of them (11) were won in the event of 60 metres.

== Medals by European Indoor Championships ==
Host nation

Championships	Athletes	Gold	Silver	Bronze	Total	Rank	Extra	Ref
1970 Vienna		0	0	0	0	-		
1971 Sofia		0	0	0	0	-		
1972 Grenoble		0	1	1	2	9th		
1973 Rotterdam		0	0	1	1	16th		
1974 Gothenburg		0	0	0	0	-		
1975 Katowice		0	0	0	0	-		
1976 Munich		0	1	0	1	13th		
1977 San Sebastián		0	0	0	0	-		
1978 Milan		0	0	0	0	-		
1979 Vienna		0	0	0	0	-		
1980 Sindelfingen		0	0	0	0	-		
1981 Grenoble		0	0	0	0	-		
1982 Milan		0	0	0	0	-		
1983 Budapest		0	0	0	0	-		
1984 Göteborg		0	0	0	0	-		
1985 Piraeus		0	0	0	0	-		
1986 Madrid		0	0	0	0	-		
1987 Liévin		0	0	0	0	-		
1988 Budapest		0	0	0	0	-		
1989 The Hague		0	0	0	0	-		
1990 Glasgow		0	0	0	0	-		
1992 Genoa		0	0	0	0	-		
1994 Paris		0	2	1	3	11th		
1996 Stockholm	24	1	2	3	6	8th		
1998 Valencia	24	1	0	1	2	11th		
2000 Ghent	22	1	1	1	3	10th		
2002 Vienna	17	1	0	1	2	12th		
2005 Madrid	24	0	2	1	3	17th		
2007 Birmingham	11	0	1	0	1	17th		
2009 Turin	7	0	0	0	0	-		
2011 Paris	14	0	0	0	0	-		
2013 Gothenburg	12	0	0	0	0	-	Details	
2015 Prague	11	0	2	0	2	18th	Details	
2017 Belgrade	7	1	1	1	3	7th	Details	
2019 Glasgow	17	1	2	1	4	6th	Details	
2021 Torun	19	1	0	0	1	15th	Details	
2023 Istanbul	19	1	2	0	3	11th	Details	
2025 Apeldoorn	19	1	0	0	1	13th	Details	
Total		9	17	12	38	26th	Details	

== Medalists ==
Name	Championships	Event	Medal
Miltiadis Tentoglou	2019 Glasgow	Men's long jump	Gold
Miltiadis Tentoglou	2021 Torun	Men's long jump	Gold
Miltiadis Tentoglou	2023 Istanbul	Men's long jump	Gold
Ekaterini Thanou	1996 Stockholm	Women's 60m	Gold
Ekaterini Thanou	2000 Ghent	Women's 60m	Gold
Ekaterini Stefanidi	2017 Belgrade	Women's pole vault	Gold
Ekaterini Stefanidi	2015 Prague	Women's pole vault	Silver
Emmanouil Karalis	2025 Apeldoorn	Men's pole vault	Gold
Emmanouil Karalis	2023 Istanbul	Men's pole vault	Silver
Angelos Pavlakakis	1998 Valencia	Men's 60m	Gold
Angelos Pavlakakis	2000 Ghent	Men's 60m	Bronze
Niki Xanthou	2002 Vienna	Women's long jump	Gold
Vasilis Papageorgopoulos	1976 Munich	Men's 60m	Silver
Vasilis Papageorgopoulos	1972 Grenoble	Men's 50m	Bronze
Georgia Kokloni	2005 Madrid	Women's 60m	Silver
Georgia Kokloni	2002 Vienna	Women's 60m	Bronze
Paraskevi Papachristou	2019 Glasgow	Women's triple jump	Silver
Paraskevi Papachristou	2017 Belgrade	Women's triple jump	Bronze
Spilios Zacharopoulos	1972 Grenoble	Men's 1500m	Silver
Alexandros Terzian	1994 Paris	Men's 60m	Silver
Konstantinos Koukodimos	1994 Paris	Men's long jump	Silver
Alexis Alexopoulos	1996 Stockholm	Men's 200m	Silver
Niki Bakoyanni	1996 Stockholm	Women's high jump	Silver
Georgios Theodoridis	2000 Ghent	Men's 60m	Silver
Styliani Pilatou	2005 Madrid	Women's long jump	Silver
Louis Tsatoumas	2007 Birmingham	Men's long jump	Silver
Antonios Mastoras	2015 Prague	Men's high jump	Silver
Konstadinos Filippidis	2017 Belgrade	Men's pole vault	Silver
Konstadinos Baniotis	2019 Glasgow	Men's high jump	Silver
Nikolaos Andrikopoulos	2023 Istanbul	Men's triple jump	Silver
Vasilios Papadimitriou	1973 Rotterdam	Men's high jump	Bronze
Georgios Panayotopoulos	1994 Paris	Men's 200m	Bronze
Panagiotis Papoulias	1996 Stockholm	Men's 3000m	Bronze
Olga Vasdeki	1996 Stockholm	Women's triple jump	Bronze
Spyridon Vasdekis	1996 Stockholm	Men's long jump	Bronze
Ekaterini Koffa	1998 Valencia	Women's 200m	Bronze
Maria Karastamati	2005 Madrid	Women's 60m	Bronze
Nikoleta Kyriakopoulou	2019 Glasgow	Women's pole vault	Bronze

== See also ==
- Greece at the IAAF World Championships in Athletics
- Greece at the IAAF World Indoor Championships in Athletics
- Greece at the European Athletics Championships
