= 2016 European Athletics Championships – Women's 100 metres =

Women's 100 metres at the 2016 European Athletics Championships
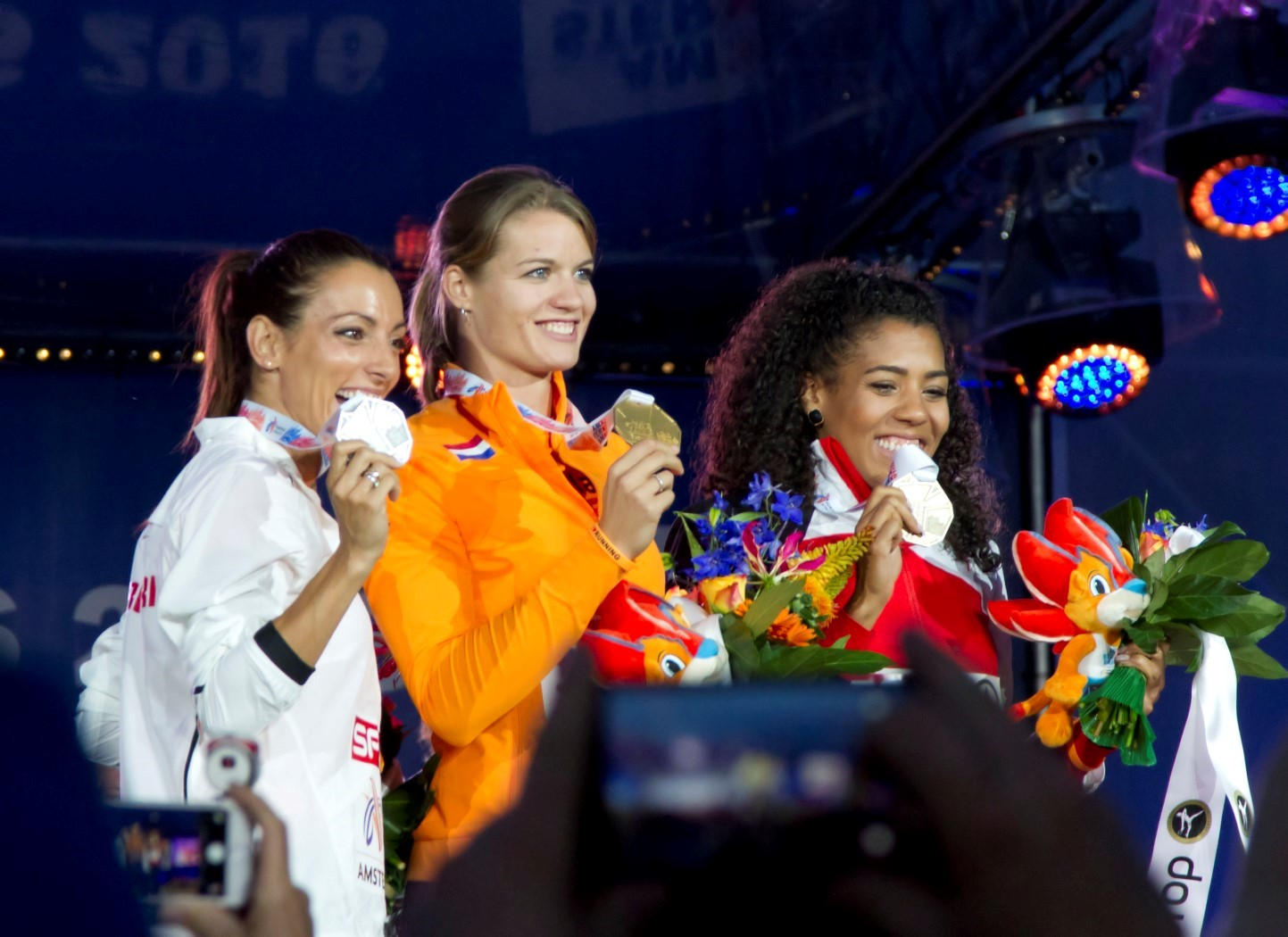
- The medalists.
- Venue: Olympic Stadium
- Location: Amsterdam
- Dates: 7 July (Round 1); 8 July (semifinals & final)
- Competitors: 30 from 21 nations
- Winning time: 10.90

Medalists
gold medal	Dafne Schippers	Netherlands
silver medal	Ivet Lalova-Collio	Bulgaria
bronze medal	Mujinga Kambundji	Switzerland

The women's 100 metres at the 2016 European Athletics Championships took place at the Olympic Stadium on 7 and 8 July.

== Records ==
Standing records prior to the 2014 European Athletics Championships
World record	Florence Griffith Joyner (USA)	10.49	Indianapolis, United States	16 July 1988
European record	Christine Arron (FRA)	10.73	Budapest, Hungary	19 August 1998
Championship record	Christine Arron (FRA)	10.73	Budapest, Hungary	19 August 1998
World Leading	Elaine Thompson (JAM)	10.70	Kingston, Jamaica	1 July 2016
European Leading	Dafne Schippers (NED)	10.83	Doha, Qatar	6 May 2016

== Schedule ==
Date	Time	Round
7 July 2016	12:45	Round 1
8 July 2016	19:15	Semifinals
8 July 2016	21:45	Final

All times are local times (UTC+2)

== Results ==
=== Round 1 ===
First 4 (Q) and next 3 fastest (q) qualify for the semifinals.

Heat 1: -0.5 m/s, Heat 2: -0.4 m/s, Heat 3: -1.0 m/s

Rank	Heat	Lane	Name	Nationality	Time	Note
1	1	1	Rebekka Haase	Germany	11.23	Q
2	1	6	Ramona Papaioannou	Cyprus	11.36	Q
2	1	4	Naomi Sedney	Netherlands	11.36	Q, SB
4	2	4	Olesya Povh	Ukraine	11.37	Q
5	1	3	Inna Eftimova	Bulgaria	11.39	Q
6	3	2	Gloria Hooper	Italy	11.40	Q
7	2	8	Maja Mihalinec	Slovenia	11.41	Q
8	3	8	Lorène Bazolo	Portugal	11.44	Q
9	3	3	Ezinne Okparaebo	Norway	11.45	Q
9	1	8	Salomé Kora	Switzerland	11.45	q, PB
11	1	7	Irene Siragusa	Italy	11.55	q
11	1	2	Maria Belibasaki	Greece	11.55	q
13	2	5	Amy Foster	Ireland	11.57	Q
14	3	5	Marika Popowicz-Drapała	Poland	11.61	Q
15	2	2	Jennifer Galais	France	11.64	Q
15	3	7	Estela García	Spain	11.64	
17	3	6	Anasztázia Nguyen	Hungary	11.66	SB
18	2	7	Alexandra Bezeková	Slovakia	11.71	
19	2	3	Andreea Ograzeanu	Romania	11.73	
20	3	4	Lina Grinčikaitė Samuolė	Lithuania	11.77	
21	2	6	Marisa Lavanchy	Switzerland	11.89	
22	1	5	Charlotte Wingfield	Malta	11.90	

=== Semifinals ===
First 2 in each heat (Q) and the next 2 fastest (q) advance to the final.

Heat 1: -1.0 m/s, Heat 2: -0.4 m/s, Heat 3: 0.2 m/s

Rank	Heat	Lane	Name	Nationality	Time	Note
1	1	5	Dafne Schippers*	Netherlands	10.96	Q
2	3	4	Desiree Henry*	Great Britain	11.09	Q
3	3	7	Mujinga Kambundji*	Switzerland	11.23	Q
4	2	5	Ivet Lalova-Collio*	Bulgaria	11.26	Q
5	2	4	Tatjana Pinto*	Germany	11.27	Q
6	2	6	Nataliya Pohrebnyak*	Ukraine	11.27	q
7	3	5	Floriane Gnafoua*	France	11.32	q
8	3	6	Olesya Povh	Ukraine	11.35	
9	1	6	Asha Philip*	Great Britain	11.37	Q
10	3	9	Ezinne Okparaebo	Norway	11.44	
10	3	8	Naomi Sedney	Netherlands	11.44	
12	1	7	Rebekka Haase	Germany	11.46	
13	2	8	Gloria Hooper	Italy	11.48	
14	1	9	Ramona Papaioannou	Cyprus	11.55	
15	1	8	Maja Mihalinec	Slovenia	11.55	
16	2	7	Lorène Bazolo	Portugal	11.57	
17	2	9	Jennifer Galais	France	11.62	
17	1	3	Maria Belibasaki	Greece	11.62	
17	3	3	Amy Foster	Ireland	11.62	
20	2	3	Salomé Kora	Switzerland	11.65	
21	2	2	Marika Popowicz-Drapała	Poland	11.68	
22	3	2	Irene Siragusa	Italy	11.78	
23	1	2	Inna Eftimova	Bulgaria	11.85	
	1	4	Stella Akakpo*	France	DQ	R162.7

*Athletes who received a bye to the semifinals

=== Final ===
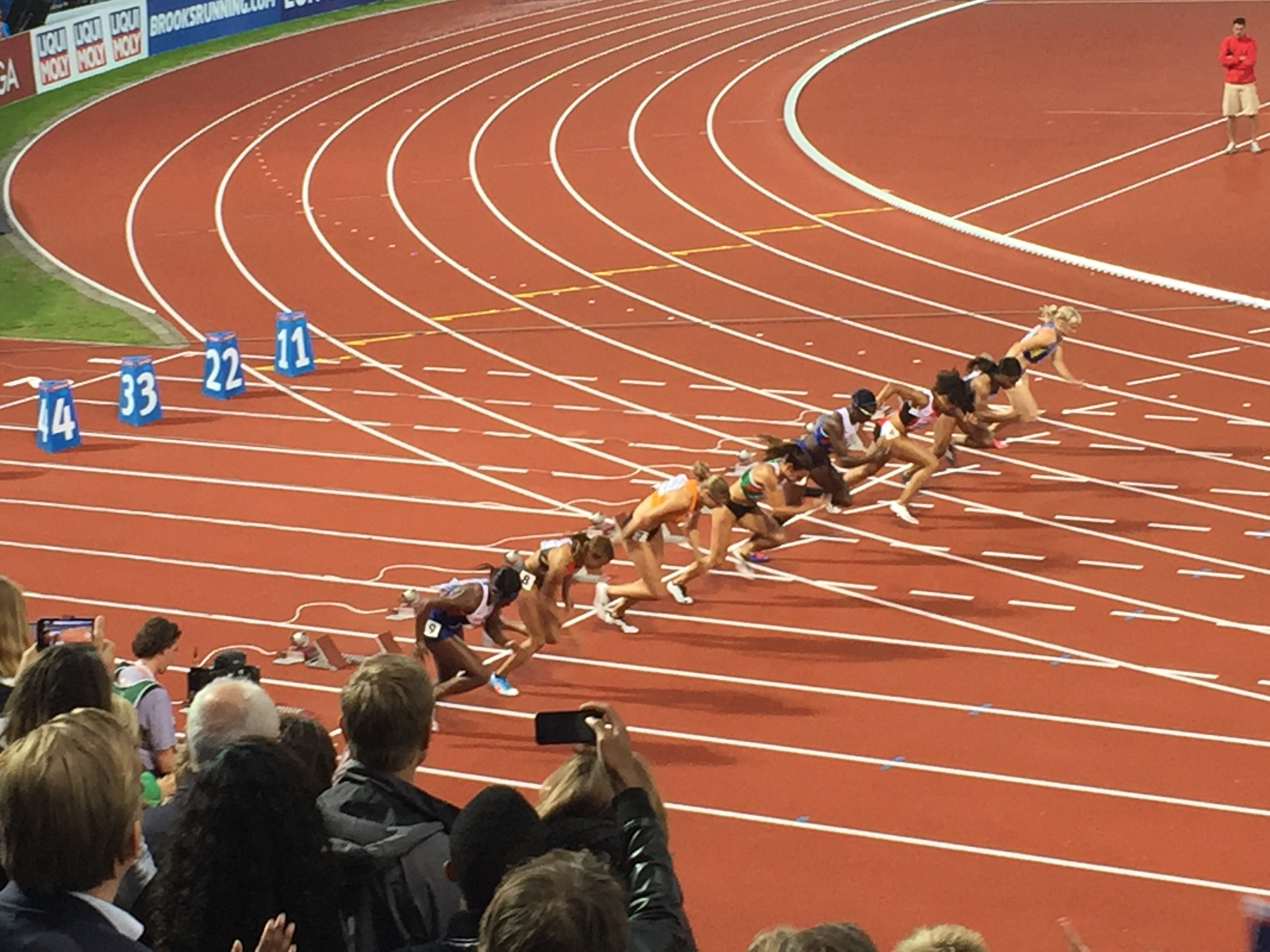
Start of the final

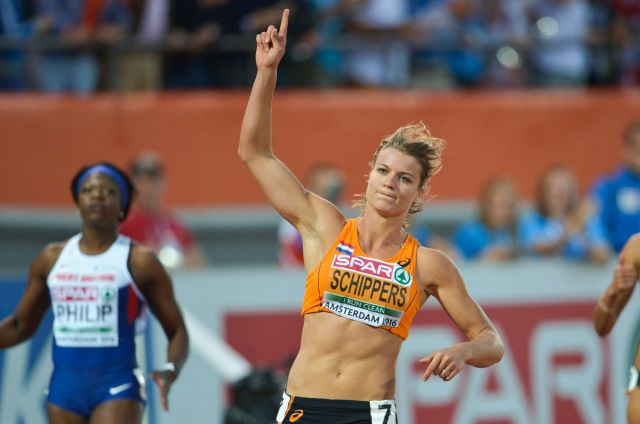
Schippers winning the final

Wind: -0.2 m/s

Rank	Lane	Name	Nationality	Time	Note
1st place, gold medalist(s)	7	Dafne Schippers	Netherlands	10.90	
2nd place, silver medalist(s)	6	Ivet Lalova-Collio	Bulgaria	11.20	
3rd place, bronze medalist(s)	4	Mujinga Kambundji	Switzerland	11.25	
4	9	Asha Philip	Great Britain	11.27	
5	2	Nataliya Pohrebnyak	Ukraine	11.28	
6	8	Tatjana Pinto	Germany	11.33	
7	3	Floriane Gnafoua	France	11.36	
	5	Desiree Henry	Great Britain	DNF	
