= Efthymia Kolokytha =

Greek long jumper

Efthymia Kolokytha (born 9 July 1987 in Veria) is a Greek long jumper.

She won a gold medal at the 2012 Balkan Championships (relay), the bronze medal at the 2016 Balkan Championships and the silver medal at the 2019 Balkan Championships. She competed at the 2014 European Athletics Championships and the 2016 European Athletics Championships without reaching the final.

Her personal best jump is 6.66 metres, achieved in May 2016 in Kalamata.
