= Ioannis Nyfantopoulos =

Greek sprinter

Personal information
- Born: 1 November 1990 (age 36) Athens, Greece

Sport
- Country: Greece
- Sport: Athletics
- Events: 100 m, 60 m 4 × 100 m relay

Achievements and titles
- Personal bests: 10.28 (2022); 6.68 (2024); 39.11 (2022)
Medal record
Representing Greece
Men's para-athletics
Paralympic Games
Gold medal – first place	2024 Paris	100 m T11
Men's athletics
Mediterranean Games
Bronze medal – third place	2022 Oran	100 metres

Ioannis Nyfantopoulos (Greek: Ιωάννης Νυφαντόπουλος; born 1 November 1990) is a Greek sprinter competing in the events of 60 metres and 100 metres. Nyfantopoulos won 6 consecutive times the Greek Athletics Championships in the event of 100 metres (2018–2023). He represented Greece at the 2024 European Championships in Rome, as a member of the 4 × 100 metres relay team, taking the 7th place in the final.

== Para-athletics ==
Nyfantopoulos represented Greece at the 2024 Summer Paralympics, as a guide for Athanasios Ghavelas, in the 100 metres T11 event. They won the gold medal with a season's best of 11.02.

== Honours ==
Year	Competition	Venue	Position	Event	Notes
Representing Greece
2018	Mediterranean Games	Tarragona, Spain	5th	4 × 100 m relay	39.72
2018	European Championships	Berlin, Germany	19th (h)	100 m	10.44
2018	European Championships	Berlin, Germany	11th (sf)	4 × 100 m relay	39.49 SB
2022	Mediterranean Games	Oran, Algeria	3rd	100 m	10.28 PB
2022	European Championships	Munich, Germany	10th (sf)	4 × 100 m relay	39.11
2023	European Indoor Championships	Istanbul, Turkey	21st (sf)	60 m	6.71 PB
2024	World Indoor Championships	Glasgow, UK	29th (h)	60 m	6.74
2024	European Championships	Rome, Italy	18th (h)	100 m	10.40
2024	European Championships	Rome, Italy	7th	4 × 100 m relay	39.39
