= Lykourgos-Stefanos Tsakonas =

Greek sprinter (born 1990)

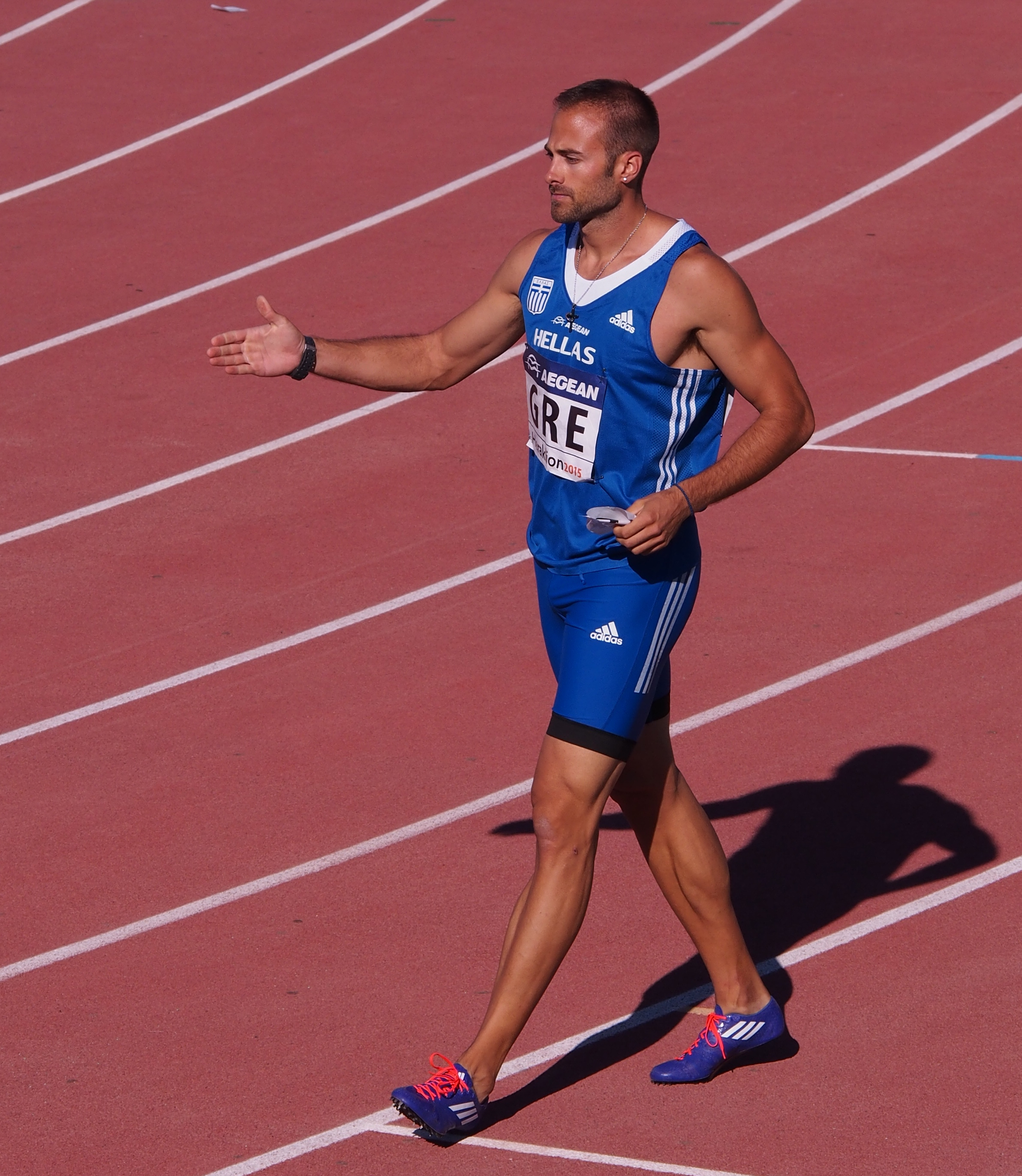
- Lykourgos-Stefanos Tsakonas after the 100m race at 2015 European Team Championships First League

Personal information
- Nationality: Greece
- Born: 8 March 1990 (age 36) Sparta, Greece
- Height: 1.90 m (6 ft 3 in)
- Weight: 78 kg (172 lb)

Sport
- Sport: Running
- Event: 200 metres

Achievements and titles
- Personal bests: 60m: 6.62 s (2016) 100m: 10.16 s (2017); 150m: 15.04 s (2017); 200m: 20.09 s (2015) 400m: 48.02 s
Medal record
European U23 Championships
Gold medal – first place	2011 Ostrava	200 m
Mediterranean Games
Gold medal – first place	Mersin 2013	200 m

Lykourgos-Stefanos Tsakonas (Greek: Λυκούργος-Στέφανος Τσάκωνας; born 8 March 1990) is a former Greek sprinter, specializing in 200 metres.

== Biography ==
Born in Sparta, he made his first international appearance at the 2007 World Youth Championships in Athletics. He participated in the 400 meters event and was eliminated in the first round. In 200 meters he was much more competitive, proving his specialty in the event. He set a personal best of 21.49 seconds to reach the final, in which eventually he failed to finish the race.

In 2008 he improved his personal best to 21.20 seconds at Athens Olympic Stadium and later competed at the 2008 World Junior Championships in Athletics where he reached the 200 m semi-finals. At the 2009 European Team Championships he took the fifth place, while at the 2009 European Athletics Junior Championships he managed to run under 21 seconds for the first time (20.94 s), taking the fourth place. He also represented Greece at the 2009 Mediterranean Games, taking the eighth place.

At the beginning of 2010, he was second at the Greek national indoor championship in 60 metres, setting a personal best of 6.76 seconds. He made an impressive progression in the summer season as well: in 200 meters he ran 20.77 s at the Papaflessia meeting, he won the 200 m national title and later took the second place at the 2010 European Team Championships with a performance of 20.69 seconds. At his first major senior competition, the 2010 European Athletics Championships in Barcelona, he entered the final and finished in the seventh place. At the 2011 European Athletics U23 Championships he won the gold medal, setting a Greek U-23 Record of 20.56 seconds to beat Britain's James Alaka (The 2011 U23 champion in 100 metres).

== International competitions ==
Year	Competition	Venue	Position	Event	Notes
Representing Greece
2008	World Junior Championships	Bydgoszcz, Poland	22nd (sf)	200m	21.83 (-0.3 m/s)
2009	Mediterranean Games	Pescara, Italy	8th	200 m	21.27
2010	European Championships	Barcelona, Spain	7th	200 m	20.90
2010	European Team Championships	Bergen, Norway	2nd	200 m	20.69
2011	European U23 Championships	Ostrava, Czech Republic	1st	200 m	20.56 (-1.4 m/s) (PB)
2011	European U23 Championships	Ostrava, Czech Republic	8th (h)^{*}	4 × 100 m relay	40.37^{*}
2012	European Championships	Helsinki, Finland	2nd (h) DSQ	200 m	20.73
2012	Summer Olympics	London, United Kingdom	12th (sf)	200 m	20.52 (PB)
2013	Mediterranean Games	Mersin, Turkey	1st	200 m	20.45 (PB)
2013	World Championships	Moscow, Russia	17th (sf)	200 m	20.56
2014	European Championships	Zurich, Switzerland	7th	200 m	20.53
2015	World Championships	Beijing, China	11th (sf)	200 m	20.22
2016	European Championships	Amsterdam, Netherlands	7th (sf)	200 m	20.48
2016	Summer Olympics	Rio de Janeiro, Brazil	23rd (sf)	200 m	20.63
2017	World Championships	London, United Kingdom	21st (sf)	200 m	20.73
2017	European Team Championships	Lille, France	3rd	200 m	20.59
2018	European Championships	Berlin, Germany	11th (sf)	200 m	20.54
2018	European Championships	Berlin, Germany	11th (h)	4 × 100 m relay	39.49

^{*}: Did not finish in the semi-final.

== Personal bests ==
Event	Performance	Date	Venue
200 meters	20.09 sec	4 June 2015	Rome, Italy
100 meters	10.16 sec	4 June 2017	Gavardo, Italy
150 meters	15.04 sec	27 May 2017	Manchester
