= Elisavet Pesiridou =

Greek hurdler (born 1992)

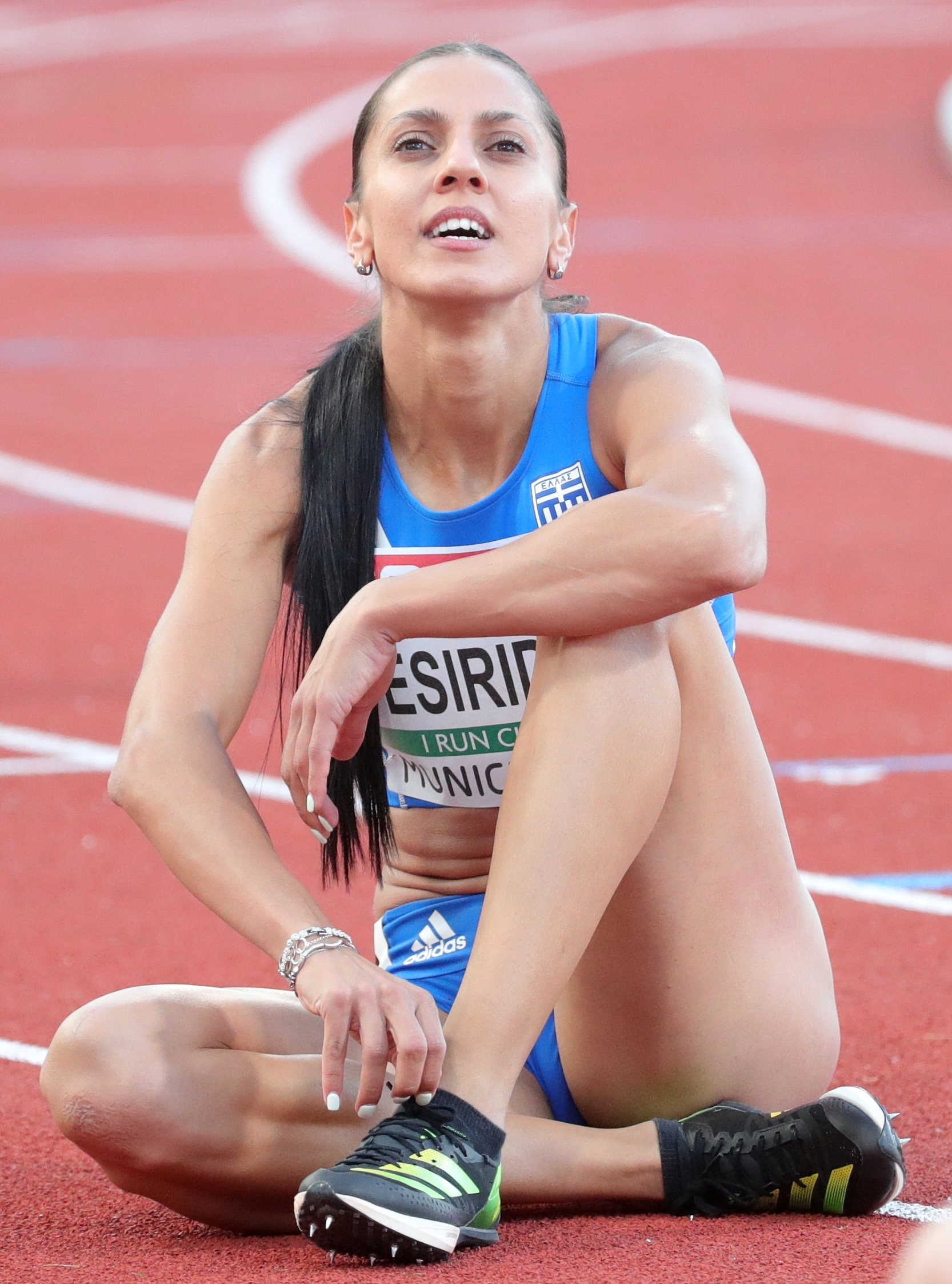
- Pesiridou in 2022

Personal information
- Born: 12 February 1992 (age 34) Katerini, Greece
- Height: 175 cm (5 ft 9 in)
- Weight: 58 kg (128 lb)

Sport
- Country: Greece
- Sport: Athletics
- Events: 100 m hurdles 60 m hurdles 4 x 100 m relay
Medal record
Mediterranean Games
Silver medal – second place	2018 Tarragona	100 m hurdles

Elisavet Pesiridou (Greek: Ελισάβετ Πεσιρίδου; born 12 February 1992) is a Greek hurdler.

She was sixth at the 2016 European Championships in Amsterdam.

Her personal best in 100 metres hurdles is 12.93 seconds, which ranks her third among Greek 100 m hurdlers of all time. In the indoor event of 60 metres hurdles, Pesiridou's best (8,04 sec) ranks her in the second place of Greek female hurdlers, only behind Flora Redoumi.

== Competition record ==
Year	Competition	Venue	Position	Event	Notes
Representing Greece
2013	European U23 Championships	Tampere, Finland	11th (sf)	100 m hurdles	13.59 PB
2014	European Championships	Zurich, Switzerland	25th (h)	100 m hurdles	13.17 PB
2014	European Championships	Zurich, Switzerland	9th (sf)	4 × 100 m relay	43.81 SB
2015	European Indoor Championships	Prague, Czech Republic	24th (h)	60 m hurdles	8.36
2016	European Championships	Amsterdam, Netherlands	6th	100 m hurdles	13.05
2016	European Championships	Amsterdam, Netherlands	14th (h)	4 × 100 m relay	44.58
2016	Olympic Games	Rio de Janeiro, Brazil	33rd (h)	100 m hurdles	13.10
2017	European Indoor Championships	Belgrade, Serbia	8th (sf)	60 m hurdles	8.10
2017	World Championships	London, United Kingdom	25th (h)	100 m hurdles	13.14
2018	World Indoor Championships	Birmingham, United Kingdom	–	60 m hurdles	DNF
2018	Mediterranean Games	Tarragona, Spain	2nd	100 m hurdles	13.30
2018	European Championships	Berlin, Germany	13th (sf)	100 m hurdles	13.00
2018	European Championships	Berlin, Germany	14th (h)	4 × 100 m relay	44.48
2021	European Indoor Championships	Toruń, Poland	38th (h)	60 m hurdles	8.31 SB
2021	Olympic Games	Tokyo, Japan	–	100 m hurdles	DNF
2022	World Indoor Championships	Belgrade, Serbia	36th (h)	60 m hurdles	8.30
2022	Mediterranean Games	Oran, Algeria	3rd	110 m hurdles	13.23
2022	European Championships	Munich, Germany	17th (sf)	100 m hurdles	13.19
2022	European Championships	Munich, Germany	13th (h)	4 × 100 m relay	44.58
2024	World Indoor Championships	Glasgow, United Kingdom	34th (h)	60 m hurdles	8.28
2024	European Championships	Rome, Italy	15th (h)	100 m hurdles	13.32
2024	European Championships	Rome, Italy	15th (h)	4 × 100 m relay	44.23
2025	European Indoor Championships	Apeldoorn, Netherlands	32nd (h)	60 m hurdles	8.70

== Personal bests ==
Date	Event	Venue	Time
18 June 2016	100 m hurdles	Patras, Greece	12.93
19 February 2017	60 m hurdles	Piraeus, Greece	8.04
