= Maria Belibasaki =

Greek sprinter (born 1991)

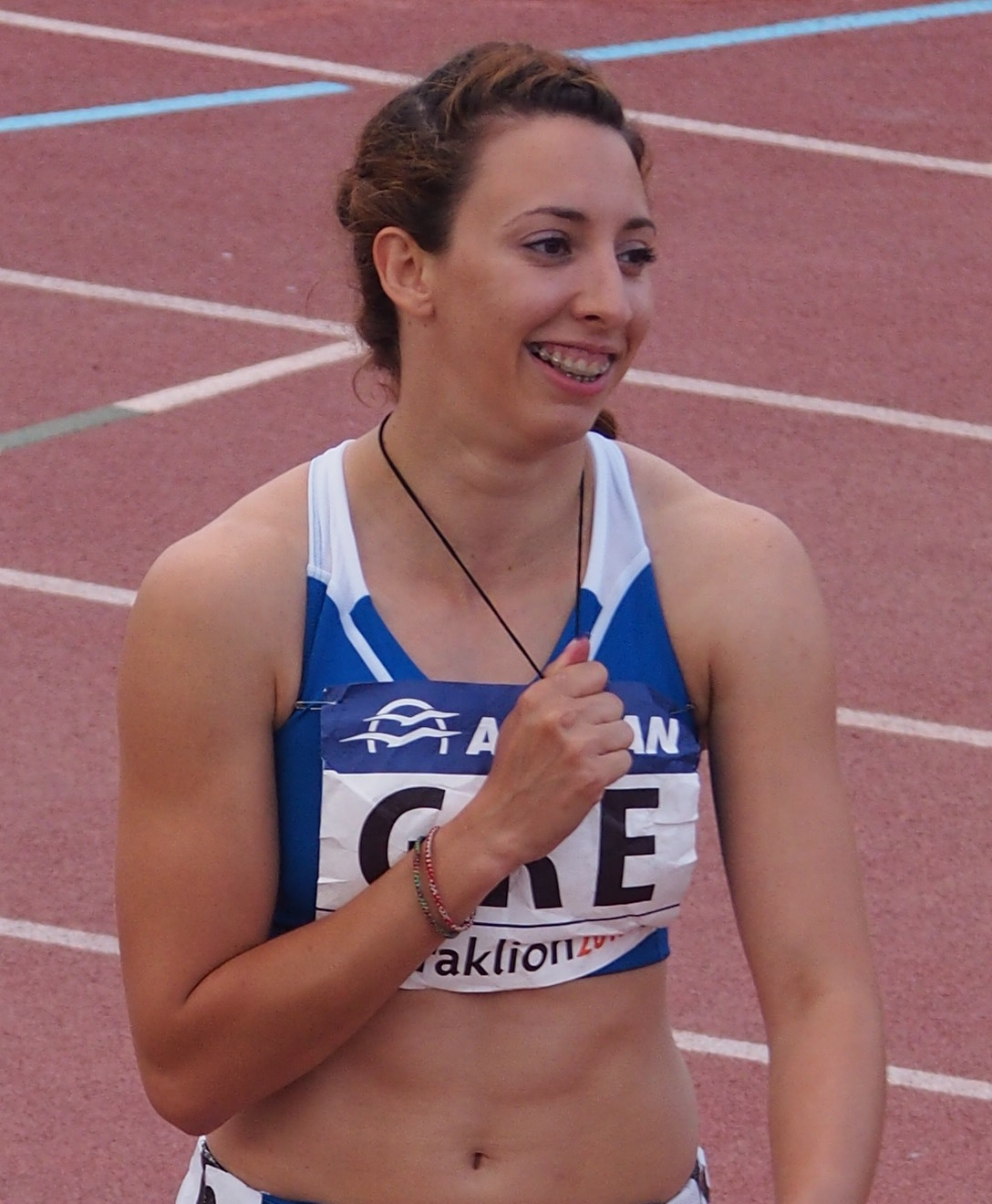
- Maria Belibasaki at 2015 European Team Championships First League

Personal information
- Born: 19 June 1991 (age 35) Agios Nikolaos, Crete, Greece
- Height: 175 cm (5 ft 9 in)
- Weight: 64 kg (141 lb)

Sport
- Country: Greece
- Sport: Athletics
- Event(s): 100m, 200m, 400m

Achievements and titles
- Personal bests: 100m: 11.34 s 200m: 22.76 s (2017); 400m: 50.45 s NR (2018) 400m (i): 52:27 s (2018)
Medal record
European Championships
Silver medal – second place	2018 Berlin	400 m

Maria Belibasaki (Greek: Μαρια Μπελιμπασακη; born 19 June 1991), also spelled Maria Belimpasaki, is a Greek retired sprinter. Belibasaki is a two-time Olympian and won a silver medal at the 2018 European Athletics Championships.

== Personal life ==
Belibasaki was born in Agios Nikolaos on the Greek island of Crete on 19 June 1991. She is a member of Sitian AO in Sitia, Crete.

== Career ==
Belibasaki made her Olympic debut at the 2012 Summer Olympics in London, England, United Kingdom. She competed in the women's 100 metres and the women's 200 metres.

The heats for the women's 100 metres took place on 3 August 2012. Belibasaki finished sixth in her heat in a time of 11.63 seconds and was eliminated from the competition.

The heats for the women's 200 metres took place on 6 August 2012. Belibasaki finished fourth in her heat in a time of 23.36 seconds and was eliminated from the competition.

Four years later, at the 2016 Summer Olympics in Rio de Janeiro, Brazil, Belibasaki again qualified to compete in the women's 200 metres. She was again eliminated in round one.

The heats for the women's 200 metres took place on 15 August 2016. Belibasaki finished fourth in her heat in a time of 23.19 seconds and was eliminated from the competition.

Belibasaki won her first European medal at the 2018 European Athletics Championships in Berlin, Germany. After advancing through the semi-finals of the women's 400 metres, she set a new Greek national record of 50.45 seconds in the final as she finished second and took home a silver medal.

== Results ==
Maria Belibasaki results
Year	Competition	Venue	Position	Event	Notes
2012	European Championships	Gothenburg, Sweden	11th (sf)	200 m	23.31
2012	European Championships	Gothenburg, Sweden	20th (h)	100 m	11.54
2012	Olympic Games	London, United Kingdom	32nd (h)	200 m	23.36
2012	Olympic Games	London, United Kingdom	46th (h)	100 m	11.63
2013	World Championships	Moscow, Russia	22nd (sf)	200 m	23.46
2014	European Championships	Zurich, Switzerland	18th (sf)	200 m	23.37
2014	European Championships	Zurich, Switzerland	9th (h)	4 × 100 m	43.81
2015	World Championships	Beijing, China	23rd (sf)	200 m	23.28
2016	European Championships	Amsterdam, Netherlands	17th (sf)	100 m	11.62
2016	European Championships	Amsterdam, Netherlands	9th (sf)	200 m	23.16
2016	European Championships	Amsterdam, Netherlands	14th (h)	4 × 100 m	44.58
2016	Olympic Games	Rio de Janeiro	37th (h)	200 m	23.19
2017	European Team Championships	Lille, France	1st	200 m	22.76 PB
2017	European Team Championships	Lille, France	8th	4 × 100 m relay	44.20
2017	World Championships	London, United Kingdom	17th (sf)	200 m	23.21
2018	World Indoor Championships	Birmingham, United Kingdom	3rd (h)	400 m	52.27^{1}
2018	European Championships	Berlin, Germany	2nd	400 m	50.45, NR

^{1}Disqualified in the semifinals
