= Hellenic Athletics Federation =

Greek sports governing body

- Sport: Athletics
- Abbreviation: SEGAS
- Founded: 7 February 1897; 129 years ago
- Affiliation: World Athletics
- Regional affiliation: EAA
- Headquarters: Nea Smyrni, Greece
- President: Sofia Sakorafa

Official website
- www.segas.gr
- (Greece)

The Hellenic Athletics Federation (Greek: Σύνδεσμος Ελληνικών Γυμναστικών Αθλητικών Σωματείων; abbreviated SEGAS) is Greece's governing body for athletics.

== SEGAS ==
SEGAS was founded on 7 February 1897 and has been the principal organiser of many international sporting competitions held in Greece. The association was behind the 1969 and 1982 European Championships, the 1995 European Indoor Championships, the 1986 World Junior Championships, the 1990 IAAF Grand Prix Final, the 1991 Mediterranean Games, the 1994 World Relay Championships, the 1995 World Marathon Cup, many Balkan Games and many European Cups. SEGAS is putting together the Athens Classic Marathon taking place in November this year. The president of the association is Sofia Sakorafa.

When two Greek sprinters were barred from the Athens Olympics in 2004 for drug abuse, SEGAS set up an independent tribunal to review the ban.

They are located at 137 Andrea Syngrou Avenue, Nea Smyrni, Greece.

== Balkan Games ==
Balkan Games was held 1953 - 1980s. In recent years separate Balkan Championships will be held instead of Games.

8th Lukoil Balkan Games was held in 2024 and 7th in 2023.
