= 2000 European Athletics Indoor Championships – Women's pole vault =

The women's pole vault event at the 2000 European Athletics Indoor Championships was held on February 25–27.

== Medalists ==
Gold	Silver	Bronze
Pavla Hamáčková; Czech Republic	Christine Adams; Germany; Yelena Belyakova; Russia	

== Results ==
=== Qualification ===
Qualification: Qualification Performance 4.30 (Q) or at least 8 best performers advanced to the final.

Rank	Athlete	Nationality	3.80	4.00	4.20	4.30	Result	Notes
1	Vala Flosadóttir	Iceland					4.30	Q
1	Pavla Hamáčková	Czech Republic					4.30	Q
3	Christine Adams	Germany					4.30	Q
3	Daniela Bártová	Czech Republic					4.30	Q
5	Yelena Isinbayeva	Russia					4.30	Q
6	Yelena Belyakova	Russia					4.30	Q
6	Janine Whitlock	Great Britain					4.30	Q
8	Sabine Schulte	Germany	o	o	o	xxx	4.20	q
9	Monika Pyrek	Poland	xxo	o	o	xxx	4.20	SB
10	Marie Rasmussen	Denmark	xo	xo	xo	xxx	4.20	NR
11	Maria Carla Bresciani	Italy					4.00	
11	Svetlana Feofanova	Russia					4.00	
11	Amandine Homo	France					4.00	
11	Monique de Wilt	Netherlands					4.00	
15	Petra Pechstein	Switzerland					4.00	
16	Yvonne Buschbaum	Germany	–	xo	xxx		4.00	
16	Krisztina Molnár	Hungary					4.00	
18	Francesca Dolcini	Italy					4.00	
19	Emilie Becot	France					4.00	
20	Tanya Koleva	Bulgaria					3.80	
21	Caroline Ammel	France					3.80	
21	Maria Rendin	Sweden					3.80	
	Doris Auer	Austria					NM	
	Zsuzsanna Szabó-Olgyai	Hungary					NM	
	Elisabete Tavares	Portugal					NM	

=== Final ===
Rank	Athlete	Nationality	3.90	4.05	4.20	4.30	4.35	4.40	4.50	Result	Notes
1st place, gold medalist(s)	Pavla Hamáčková	Czech Republic	–	o	xo	xxo	o	xxo	xxx	4.40	
2nd place, silver medalist(s)	Christine Adams	Germany	–	o	o	xo	xo	xxx		4.35	
2nd place, silver medalist(s)	Yelena Belyakova	Russia	–	o	o	xo	xo	xxx		4.35	
4	Vala Flosadóttir	Iceland	–	o	xxo	xo	xxx			4.30	
5	Janine Whitlock	Great Britain	–	o	o	xxo	xxx			4.30	
6	Sabine Schulte	Germany	o	xo	xxo	xxx				4.20	
7	Yelena Isinbayeva	Russia	o	o	xxx					4.05	
	Daniela Bártová	Czech Republic	–	xxx						NM	
