= 2002 European Athletics Championships – Women's pole vault =

Women's pole vault at the European Athletics Championships

The official results of the Women's pole vault at the 2002 European Championships in Munich, Germany. The final was held on 9 August 2002. The qualifying round was staged two days earlier, on August 7, with the mark set at 4.45 metres.

== Medalists ==
Gold	Svetlana Feofanova; Russia (RUS)
Silver	Yelena Isinbayeva; Russia (RUS)
Bronze	Yvonne Buschbaum; Germany (GER)

== Abbreviations ==
- All results shown are in metres

Q	automatic qualification
q	qualification by rank
DNS	did not start
NM	no mark
WR	world record
AR	area record
NR	national record
PB	personal best
SB	season best

== Records ==
Standing records prior to the 2002 European Athletics Championships
World Record	Stacy Dragila (USA)	4.81 m	June 9, 2001	Palo Alto, United States
Event Record	Anzhela Balakhonova (UKR)	4.31 m	August 21, 1998	Budapest, Hungary
Broken or equalled records during the 2002 European Athletics Championships
Event Record	Annika Becker (GER)	4.40 m	August 7, 2002	Munich, Germany
Event Record	Yelena Belyakova (RUS)	4.40 m	August 7, 2002	Munich, Germany
Event Record	Anna Rogowska (POL)	4.40 m	August 7, 2002	Munich, Germany
Event Record	Krisztina Molnár (HUN)	4.40 m	August 7, 2002	Munich, Germany
Event Record	Kirsten Belin (SWE)	4.40 m	August 7, 2002	Munich, Germany
Event Record	Svetlana Feofanova (RUS)	4.40 m	August 7, 2002	Munich, Germany
Event Record	Yvonne Buschbaum (GER)	4.40 m	August 7, 2002	Munich, Germany
Event Record	Yelena Isinbayeva (RUS)	4.40 m	August 7, 2002	Munich, Germany
Event Record	Monique de Wilt (NED)	4.40 m	August 9, 2002	Munich, Germany
Event Record	Annika Becker (GER)	4.40 m	August 9, 2002	Munich, Germany
Event Record	Yelena Belyakova (RUS)	4.40 m	August 9, 2002	Munich, Germany
Event Record	Yelena Isinbayeva (RUS)	4.40 m	August 9, 2002	Munich, Germany
Event Record	Svetlana Feofanova (RUS)	4.40 m	August 9, 2002	Munich, Germany
Event Record	Yelena Isinbayeva (RUS)	4.50 m	August 9, 2002	Munich, Germany
Event Record	Svetlana Feofanova (RUS)	4.50 m	August 9, 2002	Munich, Germany
Event Record	Yvonne Buschbaum (GER)	4.50 m	August 9, 2002	Munich, Germany
Event Record	Annika Becker (GER)	4.50 m	August 9, 2002	Munich, Germany
Event Record	Yelena Belyakova (RUS)	4.50 m	August 9, 2002	Munich, Germany
Event Record	Yelena Isinbayeva (RUS)	4.55 m	August 9, 2002	Munich, Germany
Event Record	Svetlana Feofanova (RUS)	4.60 m	August 9, 2002	Munich, Germany

== Qualification ==
Rank	Group A	Height					Result
Rank	Group A	3.80	4.00	4.15	4.30	4.40	Result
1	Annika Becker (GER)	-	-	o	o	o	4.40 m
2	Yelena Belyakova (RUS)	-	-	xo	xo	o	4.40 m
3	Anna Rogowska (POL)	o	xo	o	o	xo	4.40 m
4	Krisztina Molnár (HUN)	-	-	xxo	xo	xo	4.40 m
5	Kirsten Belin (SWE)	-	o	o	o	xxo	4.40 m
6	Monique de Wilt (NED)	-	o	o	o	xxx	4.30 m
7	Naroa Agirre (ESP)	o	o	xo	xo	xxx	4.30 m
8	Þórey Edda Elísdóttir (ISL)	-	xo	xxo	xo	xxx	4.30 m
9	Carolin Hingst (GER)	-	-	o	xxo	xxx	4.30 m
10	Marie Poissonnier (FRA)	-	o	o	xxx		4.15 m
11	Paulina Sigg (FIN)	o	o	xxo	xxx		4.15
12	Anita Tørring (DEN)	o	xxo	xxx			4.00 m
13	Kateřina Baďurová (CZE)	xo	xxx				3.80 m
14	Nadine Rohr (SUI)	xxo	xxx				3.80 m
—	Annalisa Meacci (ITA)	xxx					NM
—	Olga Dogadko (ISR)	xxx					NM
—	Teija Saari (FIN)	xxx					NM

Rank	Group B	Height					Result
Rank	Group B	3.80	4.00	4.15	4.30	4.40	Result
1	Svetlana Feofanova (RUS)	-	-	-	xo	o	4.40 m
2	Yvonne Buschbaum (GER)	-	-	xo	xxo	o	4.40 m
3	Yelena Isinbayeva (RUS)	-	o	o	o	xo	4.40 m
4	Vanessa Boslak (FRA)	-	o	xo	o	xxx	4.30 m
5	Monika Pyrek (POL)	-	o	o	xxo	xxx	4.30 m
6	Tanya Koleva (BUL)	-	xxo	xxo	xxo	xxx	4.30 m
7	Francesca Dolcini (ITA)	o	o	o	xxx		4.15 m
8	Zsuzsanna Szabó (HUN)	xo	o	o	xxx		4.15 m
9	Dana Cervantes (ESP)	-	o	xo	xxx		4.15 m
10	Hanna Persson (SWE)	-	xo	xo	xxx		4.15 m
11=	Agnes Livebardon (FRA)	-	o	xxx			4.00 m
11=	Vala Flosadóttir (ISL)	-	o	xxx			4.00 m
13=	Anne Latvala (FIN)	o	xxo	xxx			4.00 m
13=	Marie Bagger Bohn (DEN)	-	xxo	xxx			4.00 m
13=	Yeoryia Tsiliggiri (GRE)	o	xxo	xxx			4.00 m
—	Arianna Farfaletti (ITA)	-	xxx				NM
—	Michaela Boulová (CZE)	xxx					NM

== Final ==
Rank	Athlete	Height							Final
Rank	Athlete	4.20	4.30	4.40	4.50	4.55	4.60	4.65	Final
1st place, gold medalist(s)	Svetlana Feofanova (RUS)	-	-	o	o	-	o	x	4.60 m
2nd place, silver medalist(s)	Yelena Isinbayeva (RUS)	o	o	o	o	o	xxx		4.55 m
3rd place, bronze medalist(s)	Yvonne Buschbaum (GER)	-	xo	-	o	xxx			4.50 m
4	Yelena Belyakova (RUS)	o	o	o	xxo	xxx			4.50 m
5	Annika Becker (GER)	o	-	xo	xxo	-	xxx		4.50 m
6	Monique de Wilt (NED)	o	xxo	xo	xxx				4.40 m
7	Anna Rogowska (POL)	o	o	xxx					4.30 m
7	Krisztina Molnár (HUN)	o	o	xxx					4.30 m
9	Kirsten Belin (SWE)	xxo	o	xxx					4.30 m
10	Naroa Agirre (ESP)	xo	xo	xxx					4.30 m
11	Þórey Edda Elísdóttir (ISL)	o	-	xxx					4.20 m
11	Vanessa Boslak (FRA)	o	-	xxx					4.20 m

== See also ==
- 1998 Women's European Championships Pole Vault (Budapest)
- 1999 Women's World Championships Pole Vault (Seville)
- 2000 Women's Olympic Pole Vault (Sydney)
- 2001 Women's World Championships Pole Vault (Edmonton)
- 2003 Women's World Championships Pole Vault (Paris)
- 2004 Women's Olympic Pole Vault (Athens)
- 2006 Women's European Championships Pole Vault (Gothenburg)
