= 1999 IAAF World Indoor Championships – Women's pole vault =

The women's pole vault event at the 1999 IAAF World Indoor Championships was held on March 5.

== Results ==
Rank	Athlete	Nationality	3.85	4.05	4.20	4.35	4.45	4.50	Result	Notes
1st place, gold medalist(s)	Nastja Ryshich	Germany	–	o	o	o	xo	xxo	4.50	CR
2nd place, silver medalist(s)	Vala Flosadóttir	Iceland	o	o	xo	xxo	o	xxx	4.45	NR
3rd place, bronze medalist(s)	Nicole Humbert	Germany	–	–	o	o	xxx		4.35	
3rd place, bronze medalist(s)	Zsuzsanna Szabó-Olgyai	Hungary	–	–	o	o	xxx		4.35	
5	Melissa Mueller	United States	–	xo	o	xo	xxx		4.35	
6	Emma George	Australia	–	–	o	xxo	xxx		4.35	SB
7	Pavla Hamáčková	Czech Republic	o	xo	o	xxo	xxx		4.35	PB
8	Stacy Dragila	United States	–	xo	xo	xxo	xxx		4.35	
9	Tatiana Grigorieva	Australia	–	o	o	xxx			4.20	
9	Thórey Edda Elisdóttir	Iceland	o	o	o	xxx			4.20	
11	Monika Pyrek	Poland	xo	o	o	xxx			4.20	
12	Janine Whitlock	Great Britain	–	o	xxo	xxx			4.20	
12	Marie Poissonnier	France	o	o	xxo	xxx			4.20	
12	Masumi Ono	Japan	o	o	xxo	xxx			4.20	NR
15	Amandine Homo	France	xo	o	xxo	xxx			4.20	
16	Cai Weiyan	China	o	o	xxx				4.05	
17	Georgia Tsiliggiri	Greece	xo	o	xxx				4.05	
17	Monique de Wilt	Netherlands	xo	o	xxx				4.05	
19	Mar Sánchez	Spain	o	xo	xx				4.05	
20	Tanya Koleva	Bulgaria	xxo	xo	xxx				4.05	NR
21	Yelena Belyakova	Russia	o	xxo	xxx				4.05	
22	Sun Caiyun	China	o	xxx					3.85	
	Alejandra García	Argentina							DNS	
	Gabriela Mihalcea	Romania							DNS	
