= Gabriela Mihalcea =

Romanian athletics competitor

Medal record

Women's athletics

Representing Romania

European Indoor Championships
Bronze medal – third place	1996 Stockholm	Pole vault

Gabriela Mihalcea (née Margineanu; born 27 January 1964) is a Romanian former track and field athlete who competed in the high jump and pole vault. She holds the Romanian record of 4.25 m (13 ft 11 1/4 in) for the pole vault. She was two-time national champion in high jump and a six-time pole vault champion.

Mihalcea was the foremost Romanian woman vaulter following the event's introduction to the standard programme and won the bronze medal at the first major international championship: the 1996 European Athletics Indoor Championships. She appeared in the first world level competition (the 1997 IAAF World Indoor Championships) and was fourth in the event's debut at the 1998 European Athletics Championships.

== Career ==
Mihalcea began her career in the high jump and reached the peak of the national scene with victories at the Romanian Athletics Championships in 1983 and 1985, competing against Niculina Vasile and Alina Astafei. She achieved a best of 1.94 m (6 ft 4 1/4 in) in 1985, then had her career best of 1.96 m (6 ft 5 in) in 1987, which brought her to thirteenth on the seasonal rankings (her highest ever in that event). Her high jumping career ceased in 1987 after she was banned for two years by the International Amateur Athletics Federation for testing positive for banned steroids.

Following her return from her doping ban, she changed her focus to the pole vault, which was becoming an increasingly popular women's event (thought not yet part of international programmes). She led the way for Romanian women, taking the first three national titles that were available in the sport between 1991 and 1993. She steadily improved to 3.70 m (12 ft 1 1/2 in) in 1993 then 3.82 m (12 ft 6 1/4 in) in 1994. She ranked just outside the world's top ten during this period. She cleared four metres for the first time in 1995, doing so both indoors and outdoors. However, she lost her national streak to Gianina Rusu that same year.

The 1996 European Athletics Indoor Championships represented the first occasion that a high level international championship had hosted the women's pole vault event. At the competition she achieved a national record height of 4.05 m (13 ft 3 1/4 in), taking the bronze medal on countback to Germany's Christine Adams, though both were easily beaten by Icelandic teenager Vala Flosadóttir.

The women's pole vault gradually began to be incorporated into major competitions and the standard of the athletes improved. Mihalcea neared four metres in qualifying at the 1997 IAAF World Indoor Championships, but did not make the first ever women's final at the championship. Mihalcea improved her best to 4.10 m (13 ft 5 1/4 in) that season. The 1998 season saw her become the inaugural champion at the Balkan Indoor Athletics Championships and she also won the 1998 Balkan Athletics Championships title in a championship record of four metres (succeeding the initial champion Tania Koleva of Bulgaria). She returned to the peak of Romanian vaulting in this same period, with national titles in 1998 and 1999. She debuted at the 1998 European Athletics Championships and was among the leading entrants with a new best of 4.20 m (13 ft 9 1/4 in). She managed 4.15 m (13 ft 7 1/4 in) in the first European outdoor final, but this was only enough for fourth as Anzhela Balakhonova, Nicole Humbert and Yvonne Buschbaum shared the podium with equal marks of 4.31 m (14 ft 1 1/2 in), which would have been a world record just three years earlier.

She achieved her best results in her final year of high level competition in 1999. She was a qualified non-starter at the 1999 IAAF World Indoor Championships, but cleared 4.25 m (13 ft 11 1/4 in) indoors in Athens to set a meet record at the Balkan Indoor Championships. Mihalcea then followed this with 4.22 m (13 ft 10 in) outdoors in Dreux, France. Both of these marks were Romanian national records for the event and were also over-35 masters world records. Her masters marks were bettered by Stacy Dragila in 2008, but she remains the Romanian record holder.

Mihalcea had her last marks over four metres in the 2000 season, achieving a best of 4.10 m (13 ft 5 1/4 in) that season at the European Cup Super League in Gateshead.

== Personal bests ==
- Pole vault outdoor – 4.22 m (13 ft 10 in) (1999)
- Pole vault indoor – 4.25 m (13 ft 11 1/4 in) (1999)
- High jump outdoor – 1.96 m (6 ft 5 in) (1987)

All info from All Athletics

== National titles ==
- Romanian Athletics Championships
  - High jump: 1983, 1985
  - Pole vault: 1991, 1992, 1993, 1995, 1998, 1999

== International competitions ==
Year	Competition	Venue	Position	Event	Notes
1996	European Indoor Championships	Stockholm, Sweden	3rd	Pole vault	4.05 m NR
1997	World Indoor Championships	Paris, France	14th (q)	Pole vault	3.90 m
1998	Balkan Indoor Championships	Piraeus, Greece	1st	Pole vault	3.95 m CR
1998	European Championships	Budapest, Hungary	4th	Pole vault	4.15 m
1998	Balkan Championships	Athens, Greece	1st	Pole vault	4.00 m CR
1999	Balkan Indoor Championships	Piraeus, Greece	1st	Pole vault	4.25 m CR

== See also ==
- List of high jump national champions (women)
- List of doping cases in athletics
