= 2003 World Championships in Athletics – Women's pole vault =

The official results of the Women's Pole Vault at the 2003 World Championships in Paris, France, held on Monday August 25, 2003. There were a total number of 27 competitors.

== Medalists ==
Gold	Svetlana Feofanova; Russia (RUS)
Silver	Annika Becker; Germany (GER)
Bronze	Yelena Isinbayeva; Russia (RUS)

== Schedule ==
- All times are Central European Time (UTC+1)

Qualification Round
Group A	Group B
23.08.2003 – 16:40h	23.08.2003 – 16:40h
Final Round
25.08.2003 – 18:30h

== Abbreviations ==
- All results shown are in metres

Q	automatic qualification
q	qualification by rank
DNS	did not start
NM	no mark
WR	world record
AR	area record
NR	national record
PB	personal best
SB	season best

== Records ==
World Record	Yelena Isinbayeva (RUS)	4.82	Gateshead, England	13 July 2003
Championship Record	Stacy Dragila (USA)	4.75	Edmonton, Canada	6 August 2001
Championship Record	Svetlana Feofanova (RUS)	4.75	Edmonton, Canada	6 August 2001

== Results ==
=== Final ===
Rank	Name	Result	Notes
Gold medal	Svetlana Feofanova (RUS)	4.75 m	=CR
Silver medal	Annika Becker (GER)	4.70 m	
Bronze medal	Yelena Isinbayeva (RUS)	4.65 m	
4.	Monika Pyrek (POL)	4.55 m	
4.	Stacy Dragila (USA)	4.55 m	
6.	Yvonne Buschbaum (GER)	4.50 m	
7.	Anna Rogowska (POL)	4.45 m	PB
8.	Yelena Belyakova (RUS)	4.45 m	
9.	Gao Shuying (CHN)	4.35 m	
10.	Mary Sauer (USA)	4.35 m	
—	Þórey Edda Elísdóttir (ISL)	NM	
—	Marie Poissonnier (FRA)	NM	

=== Qualification ===
- Held on Saturday 2003-08-23

RANK	GROUP A	HEIGHT
1.	Svetlana Feofanova (RUS)	4.40 m
2.	Yvonne Buschbaum (GER)	4.40 m
3.	Monika Pyrek (POL)	4.40 m
4.	Þórey Edda Elísdóttir (ISL)	4.35 m
5.	Mary Sauer (USA)	4.35 m
6.	Natalya Kushch (UKR)	4.25 m
7.	Tanya Stefanova (BUL)	4.25 m
8.	Jillian Schwartz (USA)	4.15 m
9.	Vanessa Boslak (FRA)	4.15 m
10.	Melina Hamilton (NZL)	4.00 m
10.	Masumi Ono (JPN)	4.00 m
12.	Alejandra García (ARG)	4.00 m
—	Carolina Torres (CHI)	NM
—	Pavla Hamáčková (CZE)	DNS

RANK	GROUP B	HEIGHT
1.	Yelena Isinbayeva (RUS)	4.40 m
2.	Annika Becker (GER)	4.40 m
3.	Stacy Dragila (USA)	4.40 m
4.	Yelena Belyakova (RUS)	4.40 m
5.	Gao Shuying (CHN)	4.35 m
6.	Marie Poissonnier (FRA)	4.35 m
7.	Anna Rogowska (POL)	4.25 m
8.	Naroa Agirre (ESP)	4.25 m
9.	Carolin Hingst (GER)	4.25 m
10.	Anna Fitidou (CYP)	4.15 m
11.	Zsuzsanna Szabó (HUN)	4.15 m
11.	Becky Holliday (USA)	4.15 m
13.	Stephanie McCann (CAN)	4.00 m

== See also ==
- 1999 Women's World Championships Pole Vault (Seville)
- 2000 Women's Olympic Pole Vault (Sydney)
- 2001 Women's World Championships Pole Vault (Edmonton)
- 2002 Women's European Championships Pole Vault (Munich)
- 2003 Women's Pan American Games Pole Vault (Santo Domingo)
- 2004 Women's Olympic Pole Vault (Athens)
- 2005 Women's World Championships Pole Vault (Helsinki)
- 2006 Women's European Championships Pole Vault (Gothenburg)
