= Floé Kühnert =

German pole vaulter

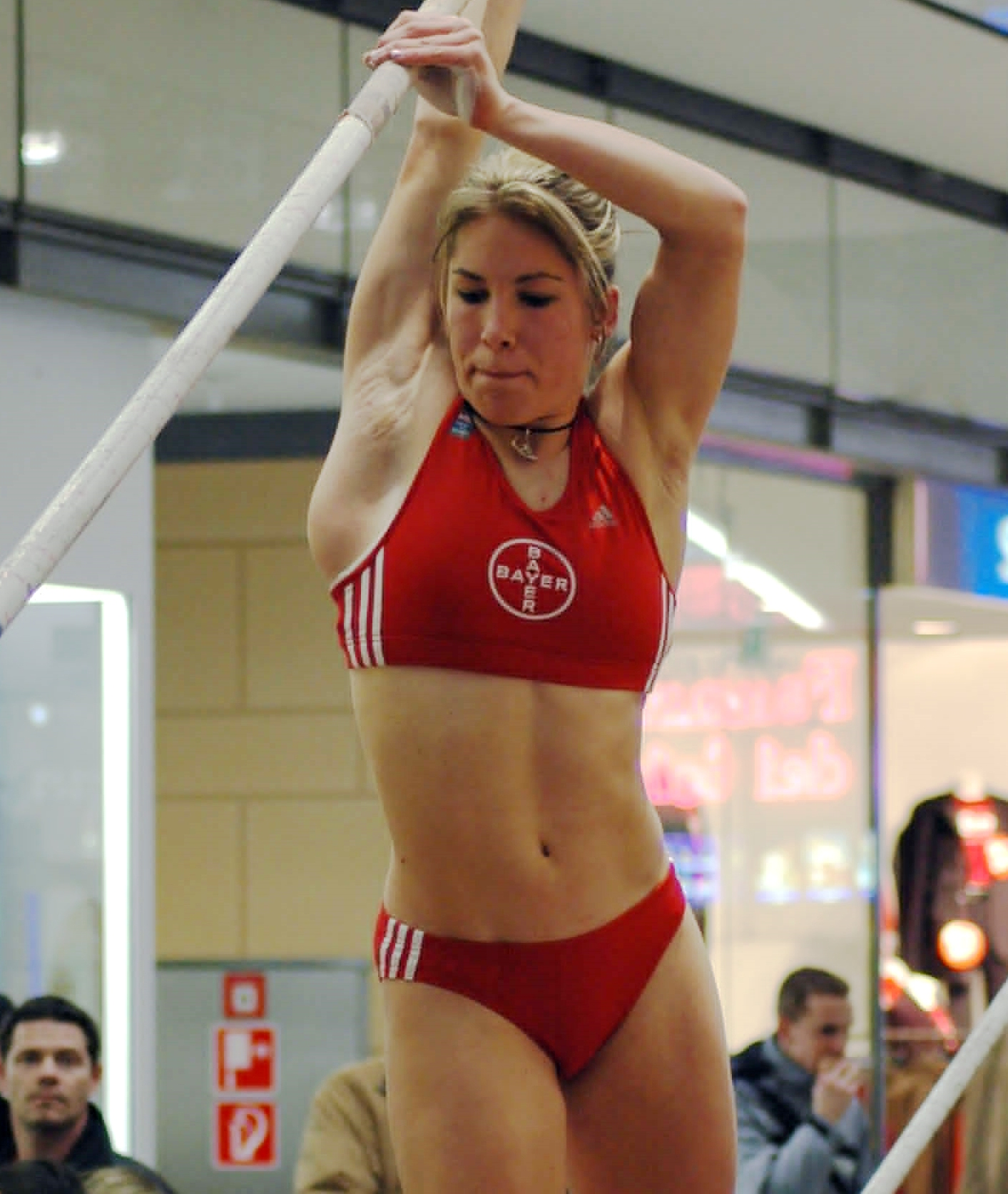
Floé Kühnert performing Pole vaulting

Floé Kühnert (born 6 March 1984) is a former German pole vaulter. She was successful at a junior level, winning a silver medal at the 1999 World Youth Championships, the gold medal at the 2002 World Junior Championships, and silver at the 2003 European Junior Championships. She competed at the 2004 Olympic Games, but did not reach the final.

Her personal best was 4.41 metres, achieved in June 2002 in Mannheim. As of September 2006, this placed her tenth on the German all-time list in pole vault, behind Annika Becker, Yvonne Buschbaum, Carolin Hingst, Anastasija Reiberger, Silke Spiegelburg, Julia Hütter, Nicole Humbert, Martina Strutz and Christine Adams.

She ended her career in 2007 and commenced medical studies in Cologne.
