= 2001 World Championships in Athletics – Women's pole vault =

The official results of the Women's Pole Vault event at the 2001 World Championships in Edmonton, Alberta, Canada, held on Monday August 6, 2001. There were a total number of 27 competitors.

== Medalists ==
Gold	Stacy Dragila; United States (USA)
Silver	Svetlana Feofanova; Russia (RUS)
Bronze	Monika Pyrek; Poland (POL)

== Schedule ==
- All times are Mountain Standard Time (UTC-7)

Qualification Round
Group A	Group B
04.08.2001 – 08:45h	04.08.2001 – 10:30h
Final Round
06.08.2001 – 14:30h

== Abbreviations ==
- All results shown are in metres

Q	automatic qualification
q	qualification by rank
DNS	did not start
NM	no mark
WR	world record
AR	area record
NR	national record
PB	personal best
SB	season best

== Records ==
Standing records prior to the 2001 World Athletics Championships
World Record	Stacy Dragila (USA)	4.81 m	June 9, 2001	Palo Alto, United States
Event Record	Stacy Dragila (USA)	4.60 m	August 21, 1999	Seville, Spain
Broken records during the 2001 World Athletics Championships
Event Record	Stacy Dragila (USA)	4.65 m	August 6, 2001	Edmonton, Canada
Event Record	Stacy Dragila (USA)	4.70 m	August 6, 2001	Edmonton, Canada
Event Record	Svetlana Feofanova (RUS)	4.75 m	August 6, 2001	Edmonton, Canada
Event Record	Stacy Dragila (USA)	4.75 m	August 6, 2001	Edmonton, Canada

== Qualification ==
RANK	GROUP A	HEIGHT
1.	Svetlana Feofanova (RUS)	4.35 m
1.	Monika Pyrek (POL)	4.35 m
3.	Mary Sauer (USA)	4.35 m
4.	Carolin Hingst (GER)	4.35 m
5.	Janine Whitlock (GBR)	4.35 m
6.	Anzhela Balakhonova (UKR)	4.25 m
7.	Monique de Wilt (NED)	4.25 m
8.	Tanya Koleva (BUL)	4.25 m
9.	Jenny Dryburgh (NZL)	4.25 m
10.	Stephanie McCann (CAN)	4.25 m NR
11.	Alejandra García (ARG)	4.25 m
12.	Vala Flosadóttir (ISL)	4.15 m
—	Déborah Gyurcsek (URU)	NM
—	Tracy O'Hara (USA)	NM

RANK	GROUP B	HEIGHT
1.	Gao Shuying (CHN)	4.35 m
1.	Stacy Dragila (USA)	4.35 m
3.	Tatiana Grigorieva (AUS)	4.55 m PB
4.	Pavla Hamáčková (CZE)	4.35 m
5.	Yvonne Buschbaum (GER)	4.35 m
6.	Þórey Edda Elísdóttir (ISL)	4.35 m
7.	Doris Auer (AUT)	4.35 m
8.	Annika Becker (GER)	4.25 m
8.	Marie Rasmussen (DEN)	4.25 m
10.	Krisztina Molnár (HUN)	4.25 m
11.	Hanna-Mia Persson (SWE)	4.15 m
12.	Mar Sánchez (ESP)	4.00 m
—	Alicia Warlick (USA)	NM

== Final ==
Rank	Athlete	Height											Result	Note
Rank	Athlete	4.10	4.25	4.35	4.45	4.50	4.55	4.60	4.65	4.70	4.75	4.82	Result	Note
1st place, gold medalist(s)	Stacy Dragila (USA)	—	—	O	O	—	O	O	XO	O	O	XXX	4.75 m	CR
2nd place, silver medalist(s)	Svetlana Feofanova (RUS)	—	—	O	O	—	O	O	XXO	O	O	XXX	4.75 m	CR
3rd place, bronze medalist(s)	Monika Pyrek (POL)	—	O	O	XO	XO	O	XXX					4.55 m	
4	Tatiana Grigorieva (AUS)	O	O	XO	XXO	—	XO	XXX					4.55 m	PB
5	Gao Shuying (CHN)	O	O	O	O	O	XXX						4.50 m	AR
6	Þórey Edda Elísdóttir (ISL)	XO	XO	XO	O	XXX							4.45 m	PB
7	Yvonne Buschbaum (GER)	—	XXO	O	XO	XXX							4.45 m	PB
8	Pavla Hamáčková (CZE)	O	O	O	XXO	XXX							4.45 m	
9	Janine Whitlock (GBR)	XO	O	XXO	XXX								4.35 m	
10	Carolin Hingst (GER)	O	O	XXX									4.25 m	
11	Doris Auer (AUT)	—	XO	XXX									4.25 m	
12	Mary Sauer (USA)	O	XXO	XXX									4.25 m	

== See also ==
- 1998 Women's European Championships Pole Vault (Budapest)
- 2000 Women's Olympic Pole Vault (Sydney)
- 2002 Women's European Championships Pole Vault (Munich)
- 2004 Women's Olympic Pole Vault (Athens)
