= Athletics at the 1999 Summer Universiade – Women's pole vault =

The women's pole vault event at the 1999 Summer Universiade was held at the Estadio Son Moix in Palma de Mallorca, Spain during 9 to 10 July.

== Medalists ==
Gold	Silver	Bronze
Pavla Hamáčková; Czech Republic	Monique de Wilt; Netherlands	Dana Cervantes; Spain

== Results ==
=== Qualification ===
Qualification: 4.05 (Q) or at least 12 best performers (q) advance to the final

Rank	Group	Athlete	Nationality	3.60	3.80	4.00	4.05	Result	Notes
1	A	Šárka Mládková	Czech Republic					4.05	Q
1	A	Dana Cervantes	Spain	–	o	o	o	4.05	Q
1	A	Doris Auer	Austria					4.05	Q
1	A	Monique de Wilt	Netherlands					4.05	Q
5	A	Melissa Price	United States					4.00	q
5	A	Amandine Homo	France					4.00	q
7	A	Yevgeniya Savina	Ukraine					3.80	
8	A	Jackie Honey	Canada					3.60	
8	A	Gao Shuying	China					3.60	
8	A	Mina Zega	Slovenia					3.60	
11	A	Januária Silva	Portugal					3.40	
1	B	Pavla Hamáčková	Czech Republic					4.05	Q
2	B	Paula Serrano	United States					4.00	q
2	B	Rachael Dacy	Australia					4.00	q
2	B	Aurore Pignot	France					4.00	q
5	B	Marie Rasmussen	Denmark					3.90	q
6	B	Francesca Dolcini	Italy					3.90	
6	B	Jenni Dryburgh	New Zealand					3.90	
8	B	Alicia Bryenton	Canada					3.60	
8	B	Ana Marisa Vieira	Portugal					3.60	
	B	Petra Pechstein	Switzerland					NM	
	B	Iva Vassileva	Bulgaria					NM	
	B	María del Mar Sánchez	Spain					DNS	

=== Final ===
Rank	Athlete	Nationality	3.70	3.90	4.00	4.10	4.20	4.25	4.36	Result	Notes
1st place, gold medalist(s)	Pavla Hamáčková	Czech Republic	–	o	–	xo	xxo	xxo	xxx	4.25	
2nd place, silver medalist(s)	Monique de Wilt	Netherlands	–	xo	o	xo	o	xxx		4.20	SB
3rd place, bronze medalist(s)	Dana Cervantes	Spain	–	xo	o	xo	–	xxx		4.10	
4	Christine Adams	Germany								4.10	
5	Šárka Mládková	Czech Republic								4.00	
6	Doris Auer	Austria								4.00	
7	Aurore Pignot	France								4.00	
8	Rachael Dacy	Australia								4.00	
9	Paula Serrano	United States								3.70	
10	Marie Rasmussen	Denmark								3.70	
	Amandine Homo	France								NM	
	Melissa Price	United States								NM	
