= 1998 European Athletics Championships – Women's pole vault =

Women's pole vault at the European Athletics Championships

The women's pole vault at the 1998 European Athletics Championships was held at the Népstadion on 18 and 21 August. The event was for the first time inducted into the European Outdoor Championships.

== Medalists ==
Gold	Anzhela Balakhonova; Ukraine
Silver	Nicole Humbert; Germany
Bronze	Yvonne Buschbaum; Germany

== Results ==
KEY:	q	Better non-qualifiers	Q	Qualified	NR	National record	PB	Personal best	SB	Seasonal best

=== Qualification ===
Qualification: Qualification Performance 4.15 (Q) or at least 12 best performers advance to the final.

Rank	Group	Athlete	Nationality	3.40	3.60	3.80	4.00	4.10	4.15	Result	Notes
1	A	Zsuzsanna Szabó	Hungary							4.15	Q
1	A	Monika Pyrek	Poland	–	o	o	o			4.15	Q, NR
1	B	Dana Cervantes	Spain	–	–	o	o	xo		4.15	Q, NR
1	B	Anzhela Balakhonova	Ukraine							4.15	Q
1	B	Vala Flosadóttir	Iceland							4.15	Q
1	B	Nicole Humbert	Germany							4.15	Q
7	B	Yvonne Buschbaum	Germany	–	–	o	o	o		4.10	q
7	A	Monique de Wilt	Netherlands							4.10	q, =NR
7	A	Anastasija Ryjikh	Germany	–	–	–	x			4.10	q
7	A	Francesca Dolcini	Italy	–	o	o	x			4.10	q
11	A	Mar Sánchez	Spain	–	o	o	o			4.00	q
11	B	Svetlana Abramova	Russia	–	–	–	o	xx		4.00	q
11	B	Pavla Hamáčková	Czech Republic	–	–	o	o			4.00	q
11	B	Gabriela Mihalcea	Romania	–	–	–	o	xx		4.00	q
11	B	Eszter Szemerédi	Hungary	–	–	o	o	x		4.00	q
16	A	Caroline Ammel	France	–	o	xxo	o			4.00	
17	B	Teija Saari	Finland	–	o	o	xo	xx		4.00	
17	B	Janine Whitlock	Great Britain	–	–	o	xo	xxx		4.00	
19	A	Doris Auer	Austria	o	xxo	o	xo			4.00	
20	A	Daniela Bártová	Czech Republic	–	–	–	xxo	xxx		4.00	
20	A	Marie Rasmussen	Denmark	–	o	o	xxo			4.00	=NR
22	B	Anna Wielgus	Poland	xo	o	xo	xxo	xx		4.00	
23	A	Þórey Edda Elísdóttir	Iceland							3.80	
24	B	Tatyana Köstem	Turkey	–	o	xo	xxx			3.80	
25	A	Yeoryia Tsiliggiri	Greece	–	xo	xo	xxx			3.80	
26	A	Teja Melink	Slovenia							3.40	
	A	Emma Hornby	Great Britain	–	xxx					NM	
	A	Yelena Belyakova	Russia	–	–	–	xxx			NM	
	B	Amandine Homo	France	–	–	xxx				NM	

=== Final ===
Rank	Athlete	Nationality	3.95	4.05	4.15	4.25	4.31	4.37	Result	Notes
1st place, gold medalist(s)	Anzhela Balakhonova	Ukraine	–	–	o	xo	xo	xxx	4.31	CR
2nd place, silver medalist(s)	Nicole Humbert	Germany	–	o	xo	o	xxo	xxx	4.31	=CR
3rd place, bronze medalist(s)	Yvonne Buschbaum	Germany	xxo	o	xxo	xo	xxo	xxx	4.31	=CR
4	Gabriela Mihalcea	Romania	–	o	o	xxx			4.15	
4	Monique de Wilt	Netherlands	o	o	o	xxx			4.15	NR
4	Anastasija Ryjikh	Germany	–	o	o	xxx			4.15	
7	Monika Pyrek	Poland	o	xo	o	xxx			4.15	=NR
8	Zsuzsanna Szabó	Hungary	–	–	xo	xxx			4.15	
9	Vala Flosadóttir	Iceland	–	xxo	xo	xxx			4.15	
10	Mar Sánchez	Spain	o	o	xxx				4.05	
11	Dana Cervantes	Spain	xo	o	xxx				4.05	
12	Pavla Hamáčková	Czech Republic	o	xxx					3.95	
12	Eszter Szemerédi	Hungary	o	–	xxx				3.95	
14	Francesca Dolcini	Italy	xo	xxx					3.95	
	Svetlana Abramova	Russia							DNS	
