= 1999 World Championships in Athletics – Women's pole vault =

Video on YouTube Official video

The official results of the women's pole vault event at the 1999 World Championships in Sevilla, Spain, held on Saturday August 21, 1999. The event was for the first time inducted into the World Outdoor Championships.

== Medalists ==
Gold	Stacy Dragila; United States (USA)
Silver	Anzhela Balakhonova; Ukraine (UKR)
Bronze	Tatiana Grigorieva; Australia (AUS)

== Schedule ==
- All times are Central European Time (UTC+1)

Qualification Round
Group A	Group B
—	—
Final Round
21.08.1999 – 19:05h

== Records ==
World Record	Emma George (AUS)	4.60	Sydney, Australia	20 February 1999
Championship Record	new event			

== Final ==
Rank	Name	4.00	4.15	4.25	4.35	4.40	4.45	4.50	4.55	4.60	4.65	Result	Notes
Gold medal	Stacy Dragila (USA)	-	o	xo	o	xo	xo	xxo	xo	xo	xxx	4.60	WR
Silver medal	Anzhela Balakhonova (UKR)	-	-	o	o	-	o	o	o	xx-	x	4.55	AR
Bronze medal	Tatiana Grigorieva (AUS)	-	o	-	o	-	o	xxx				4.45	
4	Zsuzsanna Szabó (HUN)	-	-	o	o	o	xx-	x				4.40	NR
5	Nicole Humbert (GER)	-	o	o	xo	o	xxx					4.40	
6=	Pavla Hamáčková (CZE)	xo	o	o	xo	xo	xxx					4.40	PB
6=	Daniela Bártová (CZE)	xo	o	o	xo	xo	-	xxx				4.40	
8	Yelena Belyakova (RUS)	xo	-	o	o	xxx						4.35	
9	Kellie Suttle (USA)	xo	o	xo	xxo	xxx						4.35	
10	Elmarie Gerryts (RSA)	o	o	o	xxx							4.25	
11	Alejandra García (ARG)	o	xxo	o	xxx							4.25	
12	Vala Flosadóttir (ISL)	xxo	xxo	xxo	xxx							4.25	
13	Þórey Edda Elísdóttir (ISL)	o	o	xxx								4.15	
14=	Emma George (AUS)	-	xxo	-	xxx							4.15	
14=	Yvonne Buschbaum (GER)	-	xxo	xxx								4.15	
14=	Dana Cervantes (ESP)	o	xxo	xxx								4.15	
—	Nastja Ryjikh (GER)	-	xxx									NM	
—	Melissa Price (USA)	xxx										NM	

== See also ==
- 1998 Women's European Championships Pole Vault (Budapest)
- 2000 Women's Olympic Pole Vault (Sydney)
- 2002 Women's European Championships Pole Vault (Munich)
