= 2002 European Athletics Indoor Championships – Women's pole vault =

The women's pole vault event at the 2002 European Athletics Indoor Championships was held on March 1–3.

== Medalists ==
Gold	Silver	Bronze
Svetlana Feofanova; Russia	Yvonne Buschbaum; Germany	Monika Pyrek; Poland

== Results ==
=== Qualification ===
Qualification: Qualification Performance 4.35 (Q) or at least 8 best performers advanced to the final.

Rank	Athlete	Nationality	3.80	4.00	4.20	4.30	4.35	Result	Notes
1	Monika Pyrek	Poland	–	o	o	o	o	4.35	Q
1	Svetlana Feofanova	Russia	–	–	–	–	o	4.35	Q
3	Kirsten Belin	Sweden	o	o	o	xxo	o	4.35	Q, NR
4	Christine Adams	Germany	–	–	o	–	xo	4.35	Q
4	Yelena Belyakova	Russia	–	–	o	o	xo	4.35	Q
6	Yvonne Buschbaum	Germany	–	–	xo	–	xo	4.35	Q
7	Pavla Hamáčková	Czech Republic	–	o	o	–	xxo	4.35	Q
8	Annika Becker	Germany	–	o	xo	–	xxo	4.35	Q
9	Vala Flosadóttir	Iceland	–	o	o	o	xxx	4.30	
10	Krisztina Molnár	Hungary	o	xo	xxo	o	xxx	4.30	
11	Francesca Dolcini	Italy	o	o	o	xo	xxx	4.30	=NR
12	Dana Cervantes	Spain	xo	o	o	xxx		4.20	
12	Tanya Koleva	Bulgaria	–	xo	o	xxx		4.20	
12	Anna Rogowska	Poland	xo	xo	o	xxx		4.20	
15	Georgia Tsiliggiri	Greece	o	o	xo	xxx		4.20	
15	Janine Whitlock	Great Britain	–	o	xo	xxx		4.20	
17	Emilie Becot	France	xo	o	xo	xxx		4.20	
17	Tünde Vaszi	Hungary	xo	o	xo	xxx		4.20	
19	Doris Auer	Austria	–	–	xxo	xxx		4.20	
20	Kateřina Baďurová	Czech Republic	o	o	xxx			4.00	
20	Monique de Wilt	Netherlands	–	o	xxx			4.00	
22	Hanna-Mia Persson	Sweden	xo	o	xxx			4.00	
23	Agnes Livebardon	France	–	xo	xxx			4.00	
24	Teja Melink	Slovenia	o	xxx				3.80	
	Nina Žega	Slovenia	xxx					NM	
	Maria Rasmussen	Denmark						DNS	

=== Final ===
Rank	Athlete	Nationality	3.90	4.05	4.20	4.30	4.35	4.40	4.45	4.50	4.55	4.60	4.65	4.70	4.75	Result	Notes
1st place, gold medalist(s)	Svetlana Feofanova	Russia							–	o	–	xo	xo	xxo	o	4.75	WR, CR
2nd place, silver medalist(s)	Yvonne Buschbaum	Germany				–	o	–	xo	xo	o	xxo	o	xx–	x	4.65	NR
3rd place, bronze medalist(s)	Monika Pyrek	Poland			o	–	o	–	o	xo	o	xxo	xxx			4.60	NR
4	Annika Becker	Germany	–	–	xo	o	–	xo	–	o	xo	xxx				4.55	
5	Christine Adams	Germany		–	o	–	o	–	o	xxo	xxx					4.50	
6	Pavla Hamáčková	Czech Republic														4.35	
7	Kirsten Belin	Sweden	–	xo	o	xo	–	xxx								4.30	
8	Yelena Belyakova	Russia														4.20	
