= Athletics at the 1997 Summer Universiade – Women's pole vault =

The women's pole vault event at the 1997 Summer Universiade was held at the Stadio Cibali in Catania, Italy on 27 and 29 August. This was the first time that this event was contested at the Universiade.

== Medalists ==
Gold	Silver	Bronze
Emma George; Australia	Cai Weiyan; China	Doris Auer; Austria

== Results ==
=== Qualification ===
Rank	Group	Athlete	Nationality	Result	Notes
1	A	Anzhela Balakhonova	Ukraine	4.00	Q
1	A	Cai Weiyan	China	4.00	Q
1	A	Andrea Müller	Germany	4.00	Q
1	A	Maria Carla Bresciani	Italy	4.00	Q
5	A	Elmarie Gerryts	South Africa	3.95	q
6	A	Šárka Mládková	Czech Republic	3.90	
14	A	Pascale Bourguignon	France	3.60	
1	B	Emma George	Australia	4.00	Q
1	B	Daniela Bártová	Czech Republic	4.00	Q
1	B	Caroline Ammel	France	4.00	Q
4	B	Monique de Wilt	Netherlands	3.95	q
4	B	Eszter Szemerédi	Hungary	3.95	q
4	B	Sabine Schulte	Germany	3.95	q
4	B	Doris Auer	Austria	3.95	q
8	B	Melissa Price	United States	3.90	
9	B	Dana Cervantes	Spain	3.80	
?	?	Marie Rasmussen	Denmark	3.60	
?	?	Kim Becker	United States	3.60	
?	?	Anna Fitidou	Cyprus	3.60	
?	?	Melina Hamilton	New Zealand	3.60	
?	?	Louise Schramm	Great Britain	3.60	
21	?	Rebecca Chambers	Canada	3.40	
?	?	Sophie Zubiolo	Belgium	3.40	
?	?	Trista Bernier	Canada	3.40	
	?	Zsuzsanna Szabó	Hungary	NM	
	?	Trista Bernier	Canada	NM	

=== Final ===
Rank	Athlete	Nationality	Result	Notes
1st place, gold medalist(s)	Emma George	Australia	4.40	CR
2nd place, silver medalist(s)	Cai Weiyan	China	4.30	
3rd place, bronze medalist(s)	Doris Auer	Austria	4.10	
4	Sabine Schulte	Germany	4.10	
4	Anzhela Balakhonova	Ukraine	4.10	
6	Andrea Müller	Germany	4.10	
7	Elmarie Gerryts	South Africa	4.00	
8	Daniela Bártová	Czech Republic	4.00	
8	Caroline Ammel	France	4.00	
10	Maria Carla Bresciani	Italy	3.90	
11	Monique de Wilt	Netherlands	3.90	
12	Eszter Szemerédi	Hungary	3.80	
