= 2001 IAAF World Indoor Championships – Women's pole vault =

The women's pole vault event at the 2001 IAAF World Indoor Championships was held on March 9.

== Results ==
Rank	Athlete	Nationality	4.10	4.25	4.35	4.43	4.51	4.56	4.61	Result	Notes
1st place, gold medalist(s)	Pavla Hamáčková	Czech Republic	o	o	o	xo	xo	o	xxx	4.56	CR
2nd place, silver medalist(s)	Svetlana Feofanova	Russia	–	–	xo	–	o	–	xxx	4.51	
2nd place, silver medalist(s)	Kellie Suttle	United States	xo	o	o	o	o	xxx		4.51	
4	Stacy Dragila	United States	–	o	o	xo	xo	xxx		4.51	
5	Tanya Koleva	Bulgaria	xo	xxo	xo	xxx				4.35	
6	Yvonne Buschbaum	Germany	–	o	xxx					4.25	
7	Yelena Isinbayeva	Russia	xo	xo	xxx					4.25	
	Anzhela Balakhonova	Ukraine	–	xxx						NM	
