= 1999 European Athletics U23 Championships – Women's pole vault =

The women's pole vault event at the 1999 European Athletics U23 Championships was held in Gothenburg, Sweden, at Ullevi on 29 and 31 July 1999.

== Medalists ==
Gold	Vala Flosadóttir; Iceland
Silver	Nastja Ryshich; Germany
Bronze	Dana Cervantes; Spain

== Results ==
=== Final ===
31 July

Rank	Name	Nationality	Attempts											Result	Notes
Rank	Name	Nationality	3.55	3.70	3.85	4.00	4.10	4.15	4.20	4.25	4.30	4.35	4.40	Result	Notes
1st place, gold medalist(s)	Vala Flosadóttir	Iceland	–	–	–	xo	o	o	xo	xo	xo	–	xxx	4.30	CR
2nd place, silver medalist(s)	Nastja Ryshich	Germany	–	–	–	–	xo	–	–	xo	xx–	x		4.25	
3rd place, bronze medalist(s)	Dana Cervantes	Spain	–	–	o	o	–	o	xxx					4.15	
4	Katalin Donáth	Hungary	–	–	o	o	o	xo	xxx					4.15	
5	Þórey Edda Elísdóttir	Iceland	–	–	xo	o	xo	xxo	xx–	x				4.15	
6	Aurore Pignot	France	o	o	xo	xxo	xxx							4.00	
7	Marie Poissonnier	France	–	–	o	xxx								3.85	
7	Pavla Hamáčková	Czech Republic	–	–	o	xxx								3.85	
9	Paula Fernández	Spain	–	o	o	xxx								3.85	
10	Teija Saari	Finland	–	o	xo	xxx								3.85	
11	Églantine Colin	France	o	xo	xo	xxx								3.85	
12	Christina Tsirba	Greece	o	xxo	xxx									3.70	

=== Qualifications ===
29 July
First 12 the Final

Rank	Name	Nationality	Result	Notes
1	Nastja Ryshich	Germany	3.90	Q
1	Vala Flosadóttir	Iceland	3.90	Q
1	Pavla Hamáčková	Czech Republic	3.90	Q
4	Katalin Donáth	Hungary	3.80	Q
4	Églantine Colin	France	3.80	Q
4	Marie Poissonnier	France	3.80	Q
4	Þórey Edda Elísdóttir	Iceland	3.80	Q
4	Paula Fernández	Spain	3.80	Q
9	Aurore Pignot	France	3.80	Q
10	Teija Saari	Finland	3.80	Q
10	Dana Cervantes	Spain	3.80	Q
10	Christina Tsirba	Greece	3.80	Q
13	Birgitta Ivanoff	Finland	3.65	
14	Marisa Vieira	Portugal	3.65	
15	Rhian Clarke	Great Britain	3.50	
	Mari Mar Sánchez	Spain	NM	
	Anna Fitídou	Cyprus	NM	

== Participation ==
According to an unofficial count, 17 athletes from 11 countries participated in the event.

- Cyprus (1)
- Czech Republic (1)
- Finland (2)
- France (3)
- Germany (1)
- Great Britain (1)
- Greece (1)
- Hungary (1)
- Iceland (2)
- Portugal (1)
- Spain (3)
