= Christine Adams (athlete) =

German pole vaulter (born 1974)

Personal information
- Nationality: German
- Born: February 28, 1974 (age 52)
Medal record
Women's athletics
Representing Germany
European Athletics Indoor Championships
Silver medal – second place	1996	Pole vault
Silver medal – second place	2000	Pole vault

Christine Adams (born 28 February 1974, Georgsmarienhütte) is a German pole vaulter. She won a silver medal at the 1996 European Indoor Championships and a bronze medal at the 2000 European Indoor Championships.

Her personal best is 4.42 metres, achieved in June 2001 in Weissach. This ranks her ninth among German pole vaulters, behind Annika Becker, Yvonne Buschbaum, Carolin Hingst, Anastasija Reiberger, Silke Spiegelburg, Julia Hütter, Nicole Humbert and Martina Strutz. However, with 4.66 metres Adams has a better personal best indoor.

In September 2000, Adams scored 6531 points at a women's decathlon in Lage, placing her in the top 60 performers of all time in the event as of 2025.

== Competition record ==
Year	Competition	Venue	Position	Notes
Representing Germany
1996	European Indoor Championships	Stockholm, Sweden	2nd	4.05 m
1999	Universiade	Palma de Mallorca, Spain	4th	4.10 m
2000	European Indoor Championships	Ghent, Belgium	2nd	4.35 m
2002	European Indoor Championships	Vienna, Austria	5th	4.50 m

== See also ==
- Germany all-time top lists - Pole vault
