= 2004 IAAF World Indoor Championships – Women's pole vault =

The Women's pole vault event at the 2004 IAAF World Indoor Championships was held on March 5–6.

== Medalists ==
Gold	Silver	Bronze
Yelena Isinbayeva; Russia	Stacy Dragila; United States	Svetlana Feofanova; Russia

== Results ==
=== Qualification ===
Qualification: Qualification Performance 4.45 (Q) or at least 8 best performers advanced to the final.

Rank	Athlete	Nationality	4.10	4.20	4.30	4.35	4.40	4.45	Result	Notes
1	Svetlana Feofanova	Russia	–	–	–	–	–	o	4.45	Q
2	Anna Rogowska	Poland	–	o	o	–	o	–	4.40	q
2	Vanessa Boslak	France	o	–	o	o	o	–	4.40	q
2	Yelena Isinbayeva	Russia	–	–	–	–	o	–	4.40	q
2	Monika Pyrek	Poland	–	–	o	–	o	–	4.40	q
6	Jillian Schwartz	United States	–	o	xxo	–	xo	–	4.40	q
7	Stacy Dragila	United States	–	–	–	o	–	–	4.35	q
8	Nastja Ryjikh-Reiberger	Germany	xo	–	o	–	xxx		4.30	q
9	Carolin Hingst	Germany	–	o	xo	–	xxx		4.30	SB
10	Yeoryia Tsiliggiri	Greece	xo	xo	xo	xxx			4.30	SB
11	Dana Cervantes	Spain	o	–	xxo	–	xxx		4.30	
12	Hanna-Mia Persson	Sweden	xxo	o	xxo	xx–	x		4.30	
13	Gao Shuying	China	o	o	xxx				4.20	
14	Naroa Agirre	Spain	xo	o	–	xxx			4.20	
15	Thórey Edda Elisdóttir	Iceland	–	xo	–	xxx			4.20	
16	Melina Hamilton	New Zealand	xo	xo	xxx				4.20	NR
17	Katerina Badurová	Czech Republic	o	xxx					4.10	
	Stephanie McCann	Canada	xxx						NM	
	Tünde Vaszi	Hungary							DNS	

=== Final ===
Rank	Athlete	Nationality	4.20	4.30	4.40	4.50	4.60	4.70	4.76	4.81	4.86	4.91	5.00	Result	Notes
1st place, gold medalist(s)	Yelena Isinbayeva	Russia	–	–	o	o	o	o	o	xo	o	x–	x	4.86	WR
2nd place, silver medalist(s)	Stacy Dragila	United States	–	–	xo	o	o	o	o	xxo	x–	xx		4.81	AR
3rd place, bronze medalist(s)	Svetlana Feofanova	Russia	–	–	o	o	o	o	x–	xx				4.70	
4	Jillian Schwartz	United States	xo	o	o	xxo	xo	xxx						4.60	PB
5	Vanessa Boslak	France	o	–	o	o	xxx							4.50	NR
5	Monika Pyrek	Poland	–	o	–	o	xxx							4.50	
7	Anna Rogowska	Poland	o	o	xxo	xxx								4.40	
8	Nastja Ryjikh-Reiberger	Germany	o	xo	xxo	xxx								4.40	
