= 1998 European Athletics Indoor Championships – Women's pole vault =

The women's pole vault event at the 1998 European Athletics Indoor Championships was held on 27 February–1 March.

== Medalists ==
Gold	Silver	Bronze
Anzhela Balakhonova; Ukraine	Daniela Bártová; Czech Republic	Vala Flosadóttir; Iceland

== Results ==
=== Qualification ===
Qualification Performance: 4.10 (Q) or at least 12 best performers (q) advanced to the final.

Rank	Group	Athlete	Nationality	3.40	3.60	3.80	4.00	4.10	Result	Notes
1	A	Aurore Pignot	France	–	o	o	o	o	4.10	Q, NR
1	A	Vala Flosadóttir	Iceland	–	–	–	o	o	4.10	Q
1	A	Francesca Dolcini	Italy	–	o	o	o	o	4.10	Q, NR
1	A	Janine Whitlock	Great Britain	–	–	o	o	o	4.10	Q
1	B	Anzhela Balakhonova	Ukraine	–	–	–	–	o	4.10	Q
1	B	Daniela Bártová	Czech Republic	–	–	–	o	o	4.10	Q
7	B	Amandine Homo	France	–	–	xo	o	o	4.10	Q, NR
8	A	Nicole Rieger	Germany	–	–	o	o	xo	4.10	Q
8	B	Zsuzsanna Szabó	Hungary	–	–	–	o	xo	4.10	Q
10	A	Eszter Szemerédi	Hungary	–	–	–	o	xxo	4.10	Q
11	B	Monika Götz	Germany	–	–	xo	xo	xxo	4.10	Q
12	B	Marie Rasmussen	Denmark	–	o	o	o	xxx	4.00	q
13	A	Pascale Bourguignon	France	–	o	xo	xo	xxx	4.00	
14	A	Edit Bolla	Hungary	–	o	o	xxo	xxx	4.00	
14	B	Mar Sánchez	Spain	–	o	o	xxo	xxx	4.00	NR
16	A	Anna Fitidou	Cyprus	–	o	o	xxx		3.80	
16	A	Šárka Mládková	Czech Republic	–	o	o	xxx		3.80	
16	B	Þórey Edda Elísdóttir	Iceland	–	o	o	xxx		3.80	
19	B	Georgia Tsiliggiri	Greece	xo	o	o	xxx		3.80	
20	A	Dana Cervantes	Spain	–	o	xo	xxx		3.80	
20	B	Yvonne Buschbaum	Germany	–	–	xo	xxx		3.80	
22	A	Teija Saari	Finland	–	o	xxo	xxx		3.80	
23	B	Rhian Clarke	Great Britain	o	o	xxx			3.60	
	A	Monique de Wilt	Netherlands	–	–	xxx			NM	
	B	Tanya Koleva	Bulgaria	–	xxx				NM	
	B	Maria Carla Bresciani	Italy	–	–	xxx			NM	

=== Final ===
Rank	Athlete	Nationality	3.80	3.95	4.05	4.15	4.25	4.30	4.35	4.40	4.45	4.50	Result	Notes
1st place, gold medalist(s)	Anzhela Balakhonova	Ukraine	–	–	–	o	xo	o	o	o	o	xxx	4.45	WR, CR
2nd place, silver medalist(s)	Daniela Bártová	Czech Republic	–	o	–	o	–	xxo	–	xo	xxx		4.40	
3rd place, bronze medalist(s)	Vala Flosadóttir	Iceland	–	o	o	o	o	xxo	o	xxo	xxx		4.40	
4	Janine Whitlock	Great Britain	o	o	o	o	o	xxx					4.25	NR
5	Nicole Rieger	Germany	–	–	xo	xxo	xo	xxx					4.25	NR
6	Zsuzsanna Szabó	Hungary	–	–	o	o	xxx						4.15	
7	Eszter Szemerédi	Hungary	–	–	xo	o	xxx						4.15	
8	Amandine Homo	France	xo	xo	o	xxx							4.05	
9	Francesca Dolcini	Italy	o	o	xo	xxx							4.05	
10	Aurore Pignot	France	xxo	xxo	xxo	xxx							4.05	
11	Marie Rasmussen	Denmark	o	o	xxx								3.95	
12	Monika Götz	Germany	xo	xxx									3.80	
