= 1996 European Athletics Indoor Championships – Women's pole vault =

The women's pole vault event at the 1996 European Athletics Indoor Championships was held in Stockholm Globe Arena on 8 March. It was the first time that this event was held at the European Indoor Championships and was one of the first major international pole vault competitions for women.

== Results ==
| Rank | Name | Nationality | 3.45 | 3.60 | 3.75 | 3.85 | 3.95 | 4.05 | 4.10 | 4.16 | 4.23 | Result | Notes |
|---|---|---|---|---|---|---|---|---|---|---|---|---|---|
| 1st place, gold medalist(s) | Vala Flosadóttir | Iceland | – | o | o | o | o | o | o | o | xxx | 4.16 | CR, WJR |
| 2nd place, silver medalist(s) | Christine Adams | Germany | – | – | o | o | o | o | xxx | | | 4.05 | |
| 3rd place, bronze medalist(s) | Gabriela Mihalcea | Romania | o | o | o | o | xo | o | x– | | | 4.05 | NR |
| 4 | Daniela Köpernick | Germany | – | o | – | o | o | xxx | | | | 3.95 | |
| 5 | Andrea Müller | Germany | – | – | o | o | xo | x– | xx | | | 3.95 | |
| 6 | Daniela Bártová | Czech Republic | – | – | xo | – | xo | – | xxx | | | 3.95 | |
| 7 | Anzhela Balakhonova | Ukraine | | | | | | | | | | 3.85 | |
| 8 | Anita Tomulevski | Norway | | | | | | | | | | 3.85 | NR |
| 9 | Zsuzsanna Szabó | Hungary | | | | | | | | | | 3.85 | |
| 10 | Natalya Mekhanoshina | Russia | | | | | | | | | | 3.85 | |
| 11 | Kate Staples | Great Britain | | | | | | | | | | 3.85 | |
| 12 | Caroline Ammel | France | | | | | | | | | | 3.75 | |
| 13 | Eszter Szemerédi | Hungary | | | | | | | | | | 3.75 | |
| 14 | Galina Yenvarenko | Russia | | | | | | | | | | 3.75 | |
| 15 | Maria Carla Bresciani | Italy | | | | | | | | | | 3.60 | |
| 15 | Marie Poissonnier | France | | | | | | | | | | 3.60 | |
| 17 | Silvia Delgado | Spain | | | | | | | | | | 3.60 | |
| 18 | Tiina Vilenius | Finland | | | | | | | | | | 3.45 | |
| | Teija Saari | Finland | | | | | | | | | | NM | |
