= Anna Fitídou =

Cypriot pole vaulter (born 1977)

Personal information
- Nationality: Cyprus
- Born: 22 April 1977 (age 49) Limassol, Cyprus
- Height: 1.60 m (5 ft 3 in)
- Weight: 54 kg (119 lb)

Sport
- Sport: Athletics
- Event: Pole vault
- Club: GS Olympia

Achievements and titles
- Personal best: Pole vault: 4.30 m (2004)
Medal record
Representing Cyprus
Mediterranean Games
Silver medal – second place	2005 Almeria	Pole vault

Anna Fitídou (also Anna Foitidou, Greek: Άννα Φοιτίδου; born 22 April 1977) is a Cypriot pole vaulter. She set both a national record and a personal best height of 4.30 metres at the second meeting of the IAAF Grand Prix in Thessaloniki, Greece.

Fitidou made her official debut for the 2004 Summer Olympics in Athens, where she placed twenty-fourth in the qualifying rounds of the women's pole vault, clearing her height at 4.15 metres.

At the 2006 Commonwealth Games in Melbourne, Australia, Fitidou achieved her best career result, when she finished tenth in the final round of the women's pole vault, with a satisfying height of 4.15 metres.

At the 2008 Summer Olympics in Beijing, Fitidou successfully cleared a height of 4.00 metres on her third attempt in the women's pole vault. Fitidou fell short in her bid for the twelve-woman final, as she placed thirty-fourth overall in the qualifying rounds.

== Competition record ==
Year	Competition	Venue	Position	Notes
Representing Cyprus
1997	European U23 Championships	Turku, Finland	–	NM
1997	Universiade	Catania, Italy	16th (q)	3.60 m
1998	European Indoor Championships	Valencia, Spain	16th (q)	3.80 m
1998	Commonwealth Games	Kuala Lumpur, Malaysia	10th	3.80 m
1999	European U23 Championships	Gothenburg, Sweden	–	NM
2001	Mediterranean Games	Radès, Tunisia	–	NM
2002	Commonwealth Games	Manchester, United Kingdom	11th (q)	3.80 m
2003	World Championships	Paris, France	17th (q)	4.15 m
2004	Olympic Games	Athens, Greece	24th (q)	4.15 m
2005	European Indoor Championships	Madrid, Spain	22nd (q)	4.15 m
2005	Games of the Small States of Europe	Andorra la Vella, Andorra	2nd	4.10 m
2005	Mediterranean Games	Almería, Spain	2nd	4.25 m
2005	World Championships	Helsinki, Finland	–	NM
2006	Commonwealth Games	Melbourne, Australia	10th (q)	4.15 m
2007	European Indoor Championships	Birmingham, United Kingdom	20th (q)	4.05 m
2007	Games of the Small States of Europe	Fontvieille, Monaco	1st	4.20 m
2008	Olympic Games	Beijing, China	34th (q)	4.00 m
