= Þórey Edda Elísdóttir =

Icelandic pole vaulter

Þórey Edda Elísdóttir (born 30 June 1977 in Reykjavík) is an Icelandic former pole vaulter. Her personal best is 4.60 metres, achieved in July 2004 in Madrid. This is also the current national Icelandic record. At the 2008 Summer Olympics she did not qualify for final with the result 4.15 metres.

Þórey Edda got her university degree in engineering at the University of Iceland.

She stood as a candidate for the Left-Green Movement in the 2003 Icelandic parliamentary election but did not succeed in winning a seat.

== Competition record ==
Year	Competition	Venue	Position	Notes
Representing Iceland
1997	European U23 Championships	Turku, Finland	9th	3.70 m
1998	European Indoor Championships	Valencia, Spain	16th (q)	3.80 m
1998	European Championships	Budapest, Hungary	23rd (q)	3.80 m
1999	World Indoor Championships	Maebashi, Japan	9th	4.20 m
1999	European U23 Championships	Gothenburg, Sweden	5th	4.15 m
1999	World Championships	Seville, Spain	13th	4.15 m
2000	Olympic Games	Sydney, Australia	22nd (q)	4.00 m
2001	World Championships	Edmonton, Canada	6th	4.45 m
2002	European Championships	Munich, Germany	11th	4.20 m
2003	World Indoor Championships	Birmingham, United Kingdom	9th (q)	4.35 m
2003	World Championships	Paris, France	11th	NM
2004	World Indoor Championships	Budapest, Hungary	15th (q)	4.20 m
2004	Olympic Games	Athens, Greece	5th	4.55 m
2004	World Athletics Final	Monte Carlo, Monaco	7th	4.35 m
2005	Games of the Small States of Europe	Andorra la Vella, Andorra	1st	4.40 m
2005	World Championships	Helsinki, Finland	17th (q)	4.15 m
2005	World Athletics Final	Monte Carlo, Monaco	8th	4.20 m
2007	Games of the Small States of Europe	Fontvieille, Monaco	2nd	4.10 m
2007	World Championships	Osaka, Japan	19th (q)	4.35 m
2008	Olympic Games	Beijing, China	23rd (q)	4.15 m
