= Krisztina Molnár =

Hungarian pole vaulter (born 1976)

Krisztina Molnár (born 8 April 1976 in Budapest) is a former Hungarian athlete specializing in the pole vault. She competed at two consecutive Summer Olympics, first at the 2004 Athens Games, then at the 2008 Beijing Games, both times failing to qualify for the final. Her outdoor personal best of 4.55 metres achieved in 2006 is still the Hungarian record. She also has an indoor best of 4.50 metres from 2006.

She also competed in six events at the 1992 Summer Olympics in gymnastics, when she was 16 years old.

== Competition record ==
Year	Competition	Venue	Position	Notes
Representing Hungary
2000	European Indoor Championships	Ghent, Belgium	16th (q)	4.00 m
2001	World Championships	Edmonton, Canada	18th (q)	4.25 m
2002	European Indoor Championships	Vienna, Austria	10th (q)	4.30 m
2002	European Championships	Munich, Germany	7th	4.30 m
2003	World Indoor Championships	Moscow, Russia	11th (q)	4.25 m
2004	Olympic Games	Athens, Greece	19th (q)	4.30 m
2005	European Indoor Championships	Madrid, Spain	13th (q)	4.30 m
2005	World Championships	Helsinki, Finland	20th (q)	4.15 m
2006	World Indoor Championships	Moscow, Russia	12th (q)	4.35 m
2006	European Championships	Gothenburg, Sweden	11th	4.30 m
2007	European Indoor Championships	Birmingham, United Kingdom	16th (q)	4.25 m
2008	Olympic Games	Beijing, China	26th (q)	4.15 m
