= Mary Sauer =

American pole vaulter

Mary Sauer-Vincent (born October 31, 1975, in Green Bay, Wisconsin) is an American pole vaulter. Her personal best jump is 4.65 metres (15.3 ft), achieved in July 2002 in Madrid, Spain.

== Achievements ==
Year	Tournament	Venue	Result
2001	World Championships	Edmonton, Canada	12th
2002	IAAF World Cup	Madrid, Spain	7th
2003	World Championships	Paris, France	10th
