= Kellie Suttle =

American pole vaulter (born 1973)

Personal information
- Born: May 9, 1973 (age 53) Saint Peters, Missouri, U.S.
Medal record
Women's athletics (track and field)
Representing the United States
Pan American Games
Silver medal – second place	1999 Winnipeg	Pole Vault

Kellie Suttle (born May 9, 1973, in Saint Peters, Missouri) is a retired female track and field athlete from the United States, who competed in the pole vault event.

A two-time Olympian (2000 and 2004), she won the silver medal at the 1999 Pan American Games in Winnipeg, Manitoba, Canada and the silver at the 2001 World Indoor Championships. Won 1998 outdoor US championships and 2006 indoor US championships. After competing at Arkansas State University, she became part of the training stable of former world record holder Earl Bell in Jonesboro, Arkansas and trained with a number of the world's top men and women pole vaulters.

== Competition record ==
Year	Competition	Venue	Position	Notes
Representing the United States
1998	Goodwill Games	Uniondale, United States	6th	4.10 m
1999	Pan American Games	Winnipeg, Canada	2nd	4.25 m
1999	World Championships	Seville, Spain	9th	4.35 m
2000	Olympic Games	Sydney, Australia	11th	4.00 m
2001	World Indoor Championships	Lisbon, Portugal	2nd	4.51 m
2001	Goodwill Games	Brisbane, Australia	5th	4.20 m
2003	World Indoor Championships	Birmingham, United States	4th	4.45 m
2003	Pan American Games	Santo Domingo, Dominican Republic	4th	4.10 m
2004	Olympic Games	Athens, Greece	24th (q)	4.15 m
2006	World Indoor Championships	Moscow, Russia	7th	4.40 m
