= Marie Poissonnier =

French pole vaulter

Marie Poissonnier (born 4 May 1979 in Clermont-Ferrand, Puy-de-Dôme) is a female pole vaulter from France. Her personal best jump is 4.46 metres, achieved in July 2002 in Saint-Etienne.

She finished twelfth at the 1999 IAAF World Indoor Championships in Maebashi and won the bronze medal at the 2001 Mediterranean Games in Tunis. Participating at the 2004 Olympics, she failed to qualify from her pool.

== Competition record ==
Year	Competition	Venue	Position	Notes
Representing France
1996	European Indoor Championships	Stockholm, Sweden	15th	3.60 m
1999	World Indoor Championships	Maebashi, Japan	12th	4.20 m
1999	European U23 Championships	Gothenburg, Sweden	7th	3.85 m
2000	Olympic Games	Sydney, Australia	18th (q)	4.15 m
2001	Mediterranean Games	Radès, Tunisia	3rd	3.90 m
2002	European Championships	Munich, Germany	16th (q)	4.15 m
2003	World Indoor Championships	Birmingham, United Kingdom	–	NM
2003	World Championships	Paris, France	9th (q)	4.35 m
2004	Olympic Games	Athens, Greece	34th (q)	4.00 m
