= Zsuzsanna Szabó-Olgyai =

Hungarian pole vaulter

Personal information
- Born: 6 May 1973 (age 53) Oroszlány, Hungary

Sport
- Sport: Track and field
Medal record
Representing Hungary
World Indoor Championships
Bronze medal – third place	1999 Maebashi	Pole vault

Zsuzsanna Szabó-Olgyay (born 6 May 1973) is a retired pole vaulter from Hungary, who represented her native country in the women's pole vault event at the 2000 Summer Olympics in Sydney, Australia.

== Competition record ==
Year	Competition	Venue	Position	Notes
Representing Hungary
1996	European Indoor Championships	Stockholm, Sweden	9th	3.85 m
1997	World Indoor Championships	Paris, France	11th	3.70 m
1997	Universiade	Catania, Italy	–	NM
1998	European Indoor Championships	Valencia, Spain	6th	4.15 m
1998	European Championships	Budapest, Hungary	8th	4.15 m
1999	World Indoor Championships	Maebashi, Japan	3rd	4.35 m
1999	World Championships	Seville, Spain	4th	4.40 m
2000	European Indoor Championships	Ghent, Belgium	–	NM
2000	Olympic Games	Sydney, Australia	–	NM
2001	Universiade	Beijing, China	–	NM
2002	European Championships	Munich, Germany	18th (q)	4.15 m
2003	World Championships	Paris, France	20th (q)	4.15 m
