= Marie Rasmussen =

Danish pole vaulter

Personal information
- Born: November 1, 1972 (age 53) Ringkøbing, Denmark

Sport
- Sport: Track and field

Marie Bagger Rasmussen (born November 1, 1972) is a retired pole vaulter from Denmark, who after her marriage was named as Marie Bagger Bohn. She represented her native country in the women's pole vault event at the 2000 Summer Olympics in Sydney, Australia, finishing in eighth place. She set her personal best there (4.35 metres) on September 9, 2000.

== Competition record ==
Year	Competition	Venue	Position	Notes
Representing Denmark
1997	Universiade	Catania, Italy	(q)	3.60 m
1998	European Indoor Championships	Valencia, Spain	11th	3.95 m
1998	European Championships	Budapest, Hungary	20th (q)	4.00 m
1999	Universiade	Palma de Mallorca, Spain	10th	3.70 m
2000	European Indoor Championships	Ghent, Belgium	10th (q)	4.20 m
2000	Olympic Games	Sydney, Australia	8th	4.35 m
2001	World Championships	Edmonton, Canada	14th (q)	4.25 m
