= Monique de Wilt =

Dutch pole vaulter

Personal information
- Born: 31 March 1976 (age 50) 's-Hertogenbosch, Netherlands

Sport
- Sport: Track and field
Medal record
Representing Netherlands
Summer Universiade
Silver medal – second place	1999 Palma de Mallorca	Pole vault
European U23 Championships
Bronze medal – third place	1997 Turku	Pole vault

Monique de Wilt (born 31 March 1976) is a former Dutch athlete, specializing in the pole vault. She is a 14-time national champion in that event. She won the silver medal at the 1999 Summer Universiade.

Her outdoor personal best is 4.40 meters, achieved in 2002, while her indoor best is 4.45 meters from 2003. In 2015 both Dutch national records were broken by Femke Pluim.

== Competition record ==
Year	Competition	Venue	Position	Notes
Representing Netherlands
1997	European U23 Championships	Turku, Finland	3rd	3.80 m
1997	Universiade	Catania, Italy	11th	3.90 m
1998	European Indoor Championships	Valencia, Spain	–	NM
1998	European Championships	Budapest, Hungary	4th	4.15 m (NR)
1999	World Indoor Championships	Maebashi, Japan	17th	4.05 m
1999	Universiade	Palma de Mallorca, Spain	2nd	4.20 m
2000	European Indoor Championships	Ghent, Belgium	11th (q)	4.00 m
2001	World Championships	Edmonton, Canada	15th (q)	4.25 m
2002	European Indoor Championships	Vienna, Austria	20th (q)	4.00 m
2002	European Championships	Munich, Germany	6th	4.40 m
2003	World Indoor Championships	Birmingham, United Kingdom	–	NM
