= Dana Cervantes =

Spanish pole vaulter (born 1978)

Personal information
- Full name: Dana Elvira Cervantes García
- Born: 18 August 1978 (age 48) Málaga, Spain
- Height: 166 cm (5 ft 5 in)
- Weight: 63 kg (139 lb)
Medal record
Women's athletics
Representing Spain
Mediterranean Games
Gold medal – first place	2001 Tunis	Pole vault
Universiade
Bronze medal – third place	1999 Palma	Pole vault

Dana Elvira Cervantes García (born 18 August 1978) is a Spanish former athlete specializing in the pole vault. She competed at the 2004 Olympic Games in Athens failing to get a valid jump in the final.

Her outdoor personal best is 4.40 metres achieved in 2004 while her indoor best is 4.46 metres from the same year.

== Competition record ==
Year	Competition	Venue	Position	Notes
Representing Spain
1997	World Indoor Championships	Paris, France	21st (q)	3.70 m
1997	European Junior Championships	Ljubljana, Slovenia	11th	3.60 m
1997	Universiade	Catania, Italy	(q)	3.80 m
1998	European Indoor Championships	Valencia, Spain	20th (q)	3.80 m
1998	Ibero-American Championships	Lisbon, Portugal	1st	3.95 m
1998	European Championships	Budapest, Hungary	11th	4.05 m
1999	Universiade	Palma de Mallorca, Spain	3rd	4.10 m
1999	European U23 Championships	Gothenburg, Sweden	3rd	4.15 m
1999	World Championships	Seville, Spain	14th	4.15 m
2001	Universiade	Beijing, China	4th	4.10 m
2001	Mediterranean Games	Radès, Tunisia	1st	4.10 m
2002	European Indoor Championships	Vienna, Austria	12th (q)	4.20 m
2002	European Championships	Munich, Germany	19th (q)	4.15 m
2004	World Indoor Championships	Budapest, Hungary	11th (q)	4.30 m
2004	Ibero-American Championships	Huelva, Spain	4th	4.10 m
2004	Olympic Games	Gothenburg, Sweden	14th	NM
2005	European Indoor Championships	Madrid, Spain	16th (q)	4.15 m
2005	Mediterranean Games	Almería, Spain	7th	3.80 m
2005	Universiade	İzmir, Turkey	–	NM
2006	European Championships	Gothenburg, Sweden	25th (q)	4.00 m
