= 1997 European Athletics U23 Championships – Women's pole vault =

The women's pole vault event at the 1997 European Athletics U23 Championships was held in Turku, Finland, on 13 July 1997.

== Medalists ==
Gold	Ester Szemeredi; Hungary
Silver	Janet Zach; Germany
Bronze	Sabine Schulte; Germany
Bronze	Monique de Wilt; Netherlands

== Results ==
=== Final ===
13 July

Rank	Name	Nationality	Attempts										Result	Notes
Rank	Name	Nationality	3.20	3.40	3.60	3.70	3.80	3.90	4.00	4.05	4.10	4.15	Result	Notes
1st place, gold medalist(s)	Ester Szemeredi	Hungary	–	–	–	–	o	–	o	xo	o	xxx	4.10	
2nd place, silver medalist(s)	Janet Zach	Germany	–	–	o	–	xxo	o	o	xo	x–	xx	4.05	
3rd place, bronze medalist(s)	Sabine Schulte	Germany	–	–	o	–	o	xxx					3.80	
3rd place, bronze medalist(s)	Monique de Wilt	Netherlands	–	–	o	–	o	xxx					3.80	
5	Rhian Clark	Great Britain	–	o	xo	o	o	xxx					3.80	
5	Yuliya Tsygankova	Russia	o	o	o	xo	o	xxx					3.80	
7	Šárka Mládková	Czech Republic	–	–	–	xo	–	xxx					3.70	
8	Louise Brændstrup	Denmark	xo	o	xo	xxo	xxx						3.70	
9	Þórey Edda Elísdóttir	Iceland	xo	o	xxo	xxo	xxx						3.70	
10	Dana Nováková	Czech Republic	–	o	xo	xxx							3.60	
10	Edit Bolla	Hungary	–	o	xo	xxx							3.60	
12	Tali Grinner	Israel	o	xo	xxx								3.40	
13	Petra Kratky	Austria	xxo	xo	xxx								3.40	
	Anna Fitídou	Cyprus	xxx										NM	

== Participation ==
According to an unofficial count, 14 athletes from 11 countries participated in the event.

- Austria (1)
- Cyprus (1)
- Czech Republic (2)
- Denmark (1)
- Germany (2)
- Great Britain (1)
- Hungary (2)
- Iceland (1)
- Israel (1)
- Netherlands (1)
- Russia (1)
