= Yelena Belyakova =

Russian pole vaulter (born 1976)

Yelena Belyakova (Russian: Елена Белякова; born 7 April 1976 in Moscow) is a former pole vaulter from Russia. Her personal best is 4.60 metres, achieved in August 2003 in Tula.

== International competitions ==
Representing Russia
Year	Competition	Venue	Position	Result	Notes
1997	World Indoor Championships	Paris, France	13th (q)	3.90 m	
1998	Goodwill Games	Uniondale, United States	1st	4.38 m	
1998	European Championships	Budapest, Hungary	–	NM	
1999	World Indoor Championships	Maebashi, Japan	21st	4.05 m	
1999	World Championships	Seville, Spain	8th	4.35 m	
2000	European Indoor Championships	Ghent, Belgium	2nd	4.35 m	
2000	Olympic Games	Sydney, Australia	–	NM	
2002	European Indoor Championships	Vienna, Austria	8th	4.20 m	
2002	European Championships	Munich, Germany	4th	4.50 m	
2003	World Championships	Paris, France	8th	4.45 m	
