= Vanessa Boslak =

French pole vaulter

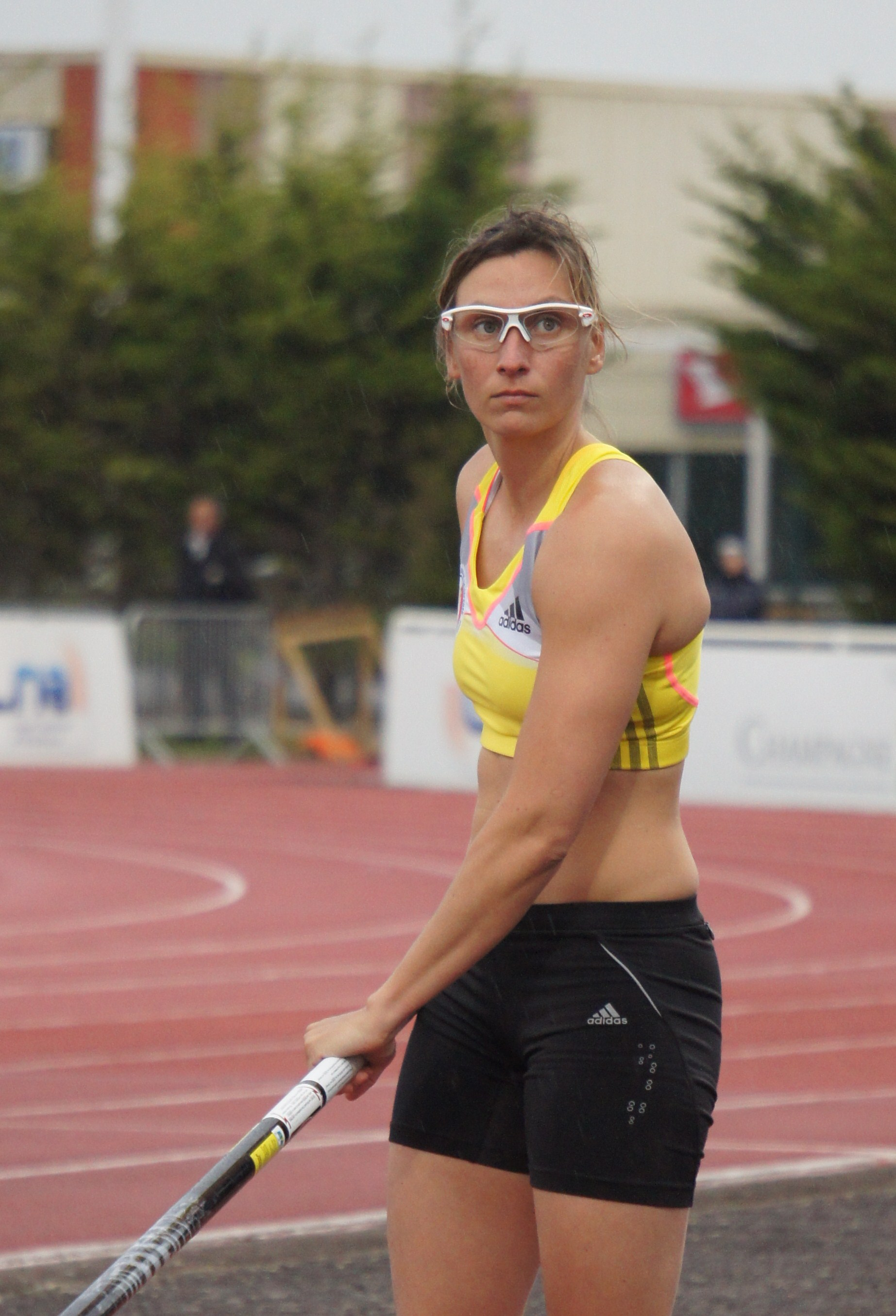
- Boslak in 2013

Personal information
- Born: 11 June 1982 (age 44) Lesquin, France
- Height: 170 cm (5 ft 7 in)
- Weight: 57 kg (126 lb)

Sport
- Country: France
- Sport: Athletics
- Event: Pole vault

Achievements and titles
- Personal bests: outdoor - 4.70 m (2006 and 2007); indoor - 4.70 m (2012)
Medal record
Women's athletics
Representing France
World Indoor Championships
| Silver medal – second place | 2012 Istanbul | Pole vault |
Mediterranean Games
| Gold medal – first place | 2005 Almería | Pole vault |
World Junior Championships
| Bronze medal – third place | 2000 Santiago | Pole vault |
World Youth Championships
| Bronze medal – third place | 1999 Bydgoszcz | Pole vault |
European U23 Championships
| Silver medal – second place | 2003 Bydgoszcz | Pole vault |
European Junior Championships
| Bronze medal – third place | 2001 Grosseto | Pole vault |

Vanessa Boslak (born 11 June 1982) is a French pole vaulter. She was born in Lesquin, France.

Boslak represented her country in major international competitions such as the Olympic Games, World Championships, World Indoor Championships, European Championships and European Indoor Championships.

Boslak's personal outdoor best is 4.70 metres, achieved at the 2006 European Cup in Málaga on 28 June 2006 and in the pole vault final of the 2007 World Championships in Osaka on 28 August 2007. She achieved her personal indoor best of 4.70m in winning the silver medal on 11 March 2012 at the 2012 World Indoor Championships in Istanbul.

== International competition record ==
- Note: Only the position and height in the final are indicated, unless otherwise stated. (q) means the athlete did not qualify for the final, with the overall position and height in the qualification round indicated.

| Year | Competition | Venue | Position | Notes |
Representing France
| 1998 | World Junior Championships | Annecy, France | 6th | 4.00 m |
| 1999 | World Youth Championships | Bydgoszcz, Poland | 3rd | 4.00 m |
| 2000 | World Junior Championships | Santiago, Chile | 3rd | 4.10 m |
| 2001 | European Junior Championships | Grosseto, Italy | 3rd | 4.15 m |
| 2002 | European Cup | Annecy, France | 3rd | 4.45 m |
| 2002 | European Championships | Munich, Germany | 11th | 4.20 m |
| 2003 | World Indoor Championships | Birmingham, United Kingdom | 8th | NM |
| 2003 | European U23 Championships | Bydgoszcz, Poland | 2nd | 4.40 m |
| 2003 | World Championships | Paris, France | 18th (q) | 4.15 m (q) |
| 2003 | World Athletics Final | Monte Carlo, Monaco | 7th | 4.25 m |
| 2004 | World Indoor Championships | Budapest, Hungary | 5th | 4.50 m (iNR) |
| 2004 | Olympic Games | Athens, Greece | 6th | 4.40 m |
| 2004 | World Athletics Final | Monte Carlo, Monaco | 7th | 4.35 m |
| 2005 | European Indoor Championships | Madrid, Spain | 13th (q) | 4.30 m (q) |
| 2005 | Mediterranean Games | Almería, Spain | 1st | 4.40 m |
| 2005 | World Championships | Helsinki, Finland | 8th | 4.35 m |
| 2005 | World Athletics Final | Monte Carlo, Monaco | 4th | 4.50 m |
| 2006 | World Indoor Championships | Moscow, Russia | 5th | 4.65 m (iNR) |
| 2006 | European Championships | Gothenburg, Sweden | 17th (q) | 4.15 m (q) |
| 2006 | European Cup | Málaga, Spain | 2nd | 4.70 m (NR) |
| 2007 | European Indoor Championships | Birmingham, England | 6th | 4.23 m |
| 2007 | World Championships | Osaka, Japan | 5th | 4.70 m (NR) |
| 2007 | World Athletics Final | Stuttgart, Germany | 8th | 4.60 m |
| 2008 | Olympic Games | Beijing, China | 9th | 4.55 m |
| 2012 | World Indoor Championships | Istanbul, Turkey | 2nd | 4.70 m (iNR) |
| 2012 | European Championships | Helsinki, Finland | 6th | 4.50 m |
| 2012 | Olympic Games | London, United Kingdom | 10th | 4.30 m |
| 2014 | European Championships | Zürich, Switzerland | 17th (q) | 4.25 m |
| 2016 | Olympic Games | Rio de Janeiro, Brazil | 28th (q) | 4.30 m |
