= Nicole Humbert =

German pole vaulter (born 1972)

Medal record

Women's athletics

Representing Germany

European Championships
Silver medal – second place	1998 Budapest	Pole vault

Nicole Humbert (née Rieger; born 5 February 1972 in Landau) is a retired German pole vaulter.

Her personal best is 4.51 metres, achieved in July 2001 in Salamanca. This ranks her seventh among German pole vaulters, behind Annika Becker, Yvonne Buschbaum, Carolin Hingst, Anastasija Reiberger, Silke Spiegelburg and Julia Hütter. However, with 4.56 metres Humbert has a better personal best indoor.

== Achievements ==
Year	Competition	Venue	Position	Notes
Representing Germany
1997	World Indoor Championships	Paris, France	22nd (q)	3.70 m
1998	European Indoor Championships	Valencia, Spain	5th	4.25 m
1998	European Championships	Budapest, Hungary	2nd	4.31 m
1999	World Indoor Championships	Maebashi, Japan	3rd	4.35 m
1999	World Championships	Seville, Spain	5th	4.40 m
2000	Olympic Games	Sydney, Australia	5th	4.45 m
