= Nadine Rohr =

Swiss pole vaulter

Nadine Rohr (born 29 June 1977) is a Swiss pole vaulter.

== Personal life ==
She is a sister of fellow athlete Alain Rohr.

== Career ==
She finished thirteenth at the 2001 Summer Universiade, won the bronze medal at the 2003 Summer Universiade and the silver medal at the 2005 Summer Universiade. She also competed at the 2002 European Championships, the 2004 Olympic Games and the 2005 World Championships without reaching the final.

Domestically, Rohr became Swiss champion every year from 1999–2001, 2003–2005 as well as 2008. Indoors, she took the Swiss title in every year from 2002 through 2006.

Overcoming the 4-metre mark in 2001 and improving to 4.21 in 2002, Rohr vaulted 4.30 metres in August 2003 in Baden. It was not accepted as a Swiss record because the "contact surface for the crossbar was too large". Nonetheless, she finally achieved a legitimate 4.30 result in June 2004 in Geneva. This is what qualified her for the 2004 Olympic Games.

4.30 was also her season's best in 2005 and 2006 (indoors), which was also the first year the Swiss indoor record was brought up to 4.30.

Following a more mediocre 2007 which was partially disrupted by a patellar tendon injury, Rohr cleared 4.40 metres in August 2008 in Fribourg. However, her clearance of 4.40 metres came too late to qualify for the 2008 Olympic Games. Nadine Rohr announced her retirement in late 2008, expecting a child in the summer of 2009.

== Competition record ==
Year	Competition	Venue	Position	Notes
Representing Switzerland
2001	Universiade	Beijing, China	13th	3.80 m
2002	European Championships	Munich, Germany	27th (q)	3.80 m
2003	Universiade	Daegu, South Korea	3rd	4.25 m
2004	Olympic Games	Athens, Greece	24th (q)	4.15 m
2005	World Championships	Helsinki, Finland	–	NM
2005	Universiade	İzmir, Turkey	2nd	4.20 m
