= Elmarie Gerryts =

South African pole vaulter

Personal information
- Born: 25 August 1972 (age 54) Cape Town, South Africa

Sport
- Sport: Track and field
Medal record
Representing South Africa
Commonwealth Games
Silver medal – second place	1998 Kuala Lumpur	Pole vault
African Games
Silver medal – second place	1999 Johannesburg	Pole vault

Elmarie Gerryts (born 25 August 1972) is a retired pole vaulter from South Africa.

She finished tenth at the 1999 World Championships and won the silver medal at the 1999 All-Africa Games. She represented her native country at the 2000 Summer Olympics in Sydney, Australia, where she reached the final but had no valid jumps.

A seven-time national champion, she set her personal best of 4.42 metres in June 2000 at a meet in Wesel. This is (as of 2026) still the African record.

== Competition record ==
Year	Competition	Venue	Position	Notes
Representing South Africa
1997	Universiade	Catania, Italy	7th	4.00 m
1998	Commonwealth Games	Kuala Lumpur, Malaysia	2nd	4.15 m
1999	World Championships	Seville, Spain	10th	4.25 m
1999	All-Africa Games	Johannesburg, South Africa	2nd	3.60 m
2000	Olympic Games	Sydney, Australia	7th (q)	4.30 m
