= Doris Auer =

Austrian pole vaulter

Personal information
- Born: 10 May 1971 (age 55) Vienna, Austria

Sport
- Sport: Track and field
Medal record
Representing Austria
Summer Universiade
Bronze medal – third place	1997 Catania	Pole vault

Doris Auer (born 10 May 1971) is an Austrian pole vaulter. Her personal best is 4.40 metres (outdoors), achieved in September 2000 in Runaway Bay. This was the Austrian record until 2014 when Kira Grünberg broke the record jumping 4.45. Indoors Auer's best is 4.44 metres, achieved in Glasgow 2001. In the same year the former world champion Yelena Isinbayeva recorded 4.45 indoors.

After 2001 Auer's performance stagnated. In 2002, she resigned from competitive sports but continued to practise pole vaulting as a respectable amateur. Remarkable are her achievements in combining the career as an athlete with university studies and a profession literally simultaneously. She holds a university degree in Sports Sciences and History and works as a high school teacher in Vienna, Austria.

== Achievements ==
Year	Competition	Venue	Position	Event	Notes
Representing Austria
1990	World Junior Championships	Plovdiv, Bulgaria	25th (h)	200m	24.95 (wind: +0.4 m/s)
1990	World Junior Championships	Plovdiv, Bulgaria	10th (h)	4 × 100 m relay	46.59
1994	European Championships	Helsinki, Finland	—	4 × 100 m relay	DNF
1997	World Indoor Championships	Paris, France	18th (q)	Pole vault	3.70 m
1997	Universiade	Catania, Italy	3rd	Pole vault	4.10 m
1998	European Championships	Budapest, Hungary	19th (q)	Pole vault	4.00 m
1999	Universiade	Palma de Mallorca, Spain	6th	Pole vault	4.00 m
2000	European Indoor Championships	Ghent, Belgium	–	Pole vault	NM
2000	Olympic Games	Sydney, Australia	9th	Pole vault	4.25 m
2001	World Championships	Edmonton, Canada	11th	Pole vault	4.25 m
2002	European Indoor Championships	Vienna, Austria	19th (q)	Pole vault	4.20 m
