= Melissa Price (pole vaulter) =

American pole vaulter

Personal information
- Born: 20 September 1977 (age 49) Kingsburg, California, United States

Sport
- Sport: Track and field

Melissa Price (born 20 September 1977) is a retired pole vaulter from the United States.

She competed at the 1997 World Indoor Championships and the 1999 World Championships.

Her personal best jump was 4.36 m (14 ft 3 1/2 in) metres, achieved in May 1998 in Houston.

In 1995, while at Kingsburg High School in Kingsburg, California, Price set the first NFHS national high school record in the pole vault at 12' 6".

Women were so new to pole-vaulting that Price won the 1994 and 1995 National Championships while still in high school. Her 1995 victory set a new American record at 3.89 m (12 ft 9 in), beating another upstart pole vaulter from Idaho State University, Stacy Dragila. Price, then competing for Fresno State University finished second to Dragila the next two years and finished third in 1999. But in 2000, the first Olympic year for women's pole vault, the competition had increased. Price would have needed to jump almost her personal best at the Olympic Trials just to get to Sydney, while Dragila raised the world record up to 4.63 m (15 ft 2 1/4 in) in that same meet. In Sydney, Dragila won the first gold medal.
