= Svetlana Feofanova =

Russian pole vaulter (born 1980)

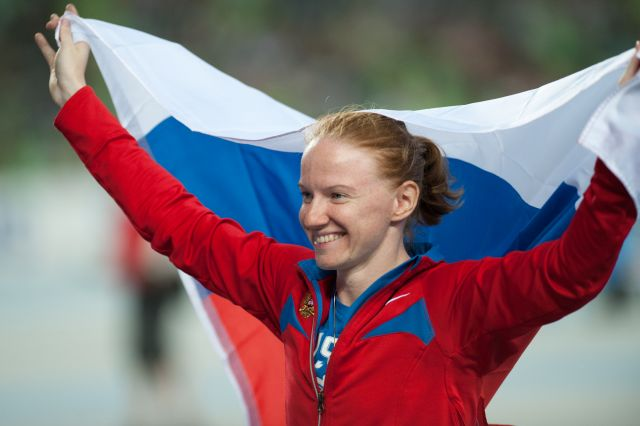
- Svetlana Feofanova in 2011

Personal information
- Born: 16 July 1980 (age 46) Moscow, Soviet Union
- Height: 1.60 m (5 ft 3 in)
- Weight: 49 kg (108 lb)

Sport
- Country: Russia
- Sport: Athletics
- Event: Pole Vault
- Club: Dynamo Moscow
Medal record
Olympic Games
| Silver medal – second place | 2004 Athens | Pole vault |
| Bronze medal – third place | 2008 Beijing | Pole vault |
World Championships
| Gold medal – first place | 2003 Paris | Pole vault |
| Silver medal – second place | 2001 Edmonton | Pole vault |
| Bronze medal – third place | 2007 Osaka | Pole vault |
| Bronze medal – third place | 2011 Daegu | Pole vault |
World Indoor Championships
| Gold medal – first place | 2003 Birmingham | Pole vault |
| Silver medal – second place | 2001 Lisbon | Pole vault |
| Silver medal – second place | 2010 Doha | Pole vault |
| Bronze medal – third place | 2004 Budapest | Pole vault |
| Bronze medal – third place | 2006 Moscow | Pole vault |
European Championships
| Gold medal – first place | 2002 Munich | Pole vault |
| Gold medal – first place | 2010 Barcelona | Pole vault |
- Updated on 6 August 2012

Svetlana Yevgenyevna Feofanova (Russian: Светлана Евгеньевна Феофанова; born 16 July 1980) is a Russian pole vaulter.

Svetlana Feofanova was born in Moscow, Soviet Union. She has studied at the Finance University under the Government of the Russian Federation. Feofanova was a gymnast in her youth but did not continue competing in the sport.

In the World Athletics Championships, she was second in 2001 and first in 2003. She also won the World Indoor Championships in 2003, and she was third in 2004. She finished fourth at the 2006 European Athletics Championships in Gothenburg, Sweden. On 4 July 2004 she pole vaulted 4.88 m (16.0 ft) in Heraklion, Greece, which was a world record at the time.

She won the silver medal in women's pole vaulting at the 2004 Summer Olympics (behind compatriot Yelena Isinbayeva). She won the 2007 European Athletics Indoor Championships gold medal for the pole vault in Birmingham, England, at 4.76 m (15.6 ft). She won the bronze in the 2008 Summer Olympics.

== Personal bests ==
- Pole Vault (outdoors) = 4.88 m (16.0 ft), July 2004 — tenth on the all-time list
- Pole Vault (indoors) = 4.85 m (15.9 ft), February 2004 — ninth on the indoor all-time list

== National titles ==
- 6 times Russian National Outdoor Pole Vault Champion: 2001, '06, '07, '08, '11, '12
- 4 times Russian National Indoor Pole Vault Champion: 2001, '06, '08, '10

== International competitions ==
Representing Russia
| Year | Competition | Venue | Position | Result | Notes |
|---|---|---|---|---|---|
| 2000 | Olympic Games | Sydney, Australia | — | NM (q) | |
| 2001 | World Indoor Championships | Lisbon, Portugal | 2nd | 4.51 | |
| 2001 | World Championships | Edmonton, Canada | 2nd | 4.75 | |
| 2002 | European Indoor Championships | Vienna, Austria | 1st | 4.75 | |
| 2002 | European Championships | Munich, Germany | 1st | 4.60 | |
| 2003 | World Indoor Championships | Birmingham, United Kingdom | 1st | 4.80 | |
| 2003 | World Championships | Paris, France | 1st | 4.75 | |
| 2004 | World Indoor Championships | Budapest, Hungary | 3rd | 4.70 | |
| 2004 | Olympic Games | Athens, Greece | 2nd | 4.75 | |
| 2006 | World Indoor Championships | Moscow, Russia | 3rd | 4.70 | |
| 2006 | European Championships | Gothenburg, Sweden | 4th | 4.50 | |
| 2007 | European Indoor Championships | Birmingham, United Kingdom | 1st | 4.76 | |
| 2007 | World Championships | Osaka, Japan | 3rd | 4.75 | |
| 2008 | World Indoor Championships | Valencia, Spain | 5th | 4.60 | |
| 2008 | Olympic Games | Beijing, China | 3rd | 4.75 | |
| 2010 | World Indoor Championships | Doha, Qatar | 2nd | 4.80 | |
| 2010 | European Championships | Barcelona, Spain | 1st | 4.75 | |
| 2010 | Continental Cup | Split, Croatia | 1st | 4.60 | |
| 2011 | World Championships | Daegu, South Korea | 3rd | 4.75 | |
| 2012 | Olympic Games | London, United Kingdom | — | NM (q) | |

- NM = No Mark (no-height)
- At both the 2000 and 2012 Olympics, Feofanova went out of the qualifying competition without clearing a height. In Sydney, she had three failures at 4.15 m (13.6 ft), while in London she failed twice at 4.40 m (14.4 ft) and on her final attempt, failed at 4.50 m (14.8 ft).

== See also ==
- List of Olympic medalists in athletics (women)
- List of 2004 Summer Olympics medal winners
- List of 2008 Summer Olympics medal winners
- List of World Athletics Championships medalists (women)
- List of IAAF World Indoor Championships medalists (women)
- List of European Athletics Championships medalists (women)
- List of European Athletics Indoor Championships medalists (women)
- List of pole vault national champions (women)
- List of people from Moscow
- Pole vault at the Olympics

Records
| Preceded by Yelena Isinbayeva | Women's Pole Vault World Record Holder; 22 February 2004 – 6 March 2004 | Succeeded by Yelena Isinbayeva |
| Preceded by Yelena Isinbayeva | Women's Pole Vault World Record Holder; 4 July 2004 – 25 July 2004 | Succeeded by Yelena Isinbayeva |
