= Tatiana Grigorieva =

Australian pole vaulter (born 1975)

Medal record

Women's athletics

Representing Australia

Olympic Games
Silver medal – second place	2000 Sydney	Pole vault

World Championships
Bronze medal – third place	1999 Seville	Pole vault

Goodwill Games
Bronze medal – third place	1998 New York City	Pole vault
Bronze medal – third place	2001 Brisbane	Pole vault

Commonwealth Games
Gold medal – first place	2002 Manchester	Pole vault
Silver medal – second place	2006 Melbourne	Pole vault

Tatiana Vladimirovna Grigorieva (Russian: Татьяна Владимировна Григорьева; born 8 October 1975) is a retired Australian pole vaulter. She retired from the sport in 2007 after a 10-year career that saw her win Olympic, Commonwealth and World Championship medals. She went on to star in series six of Dancing with the Stars and as Olympia on the 2008 revival of Gladiators.

== Biography ==
Grigorieva was born in Leningrad, Soviet Union, today Saint Petersburg, Russia. As a former national level hurdler in Russia, Grigorieva took up pole vaulting when she migrated to Australia in 1997. Within 12 months of picking up a pole, she became one of the world's best, placing third in the 1998 Goodwill Games in New York. In her first appearance at the 1999 World Championships in Athletics, she won the bronze medal.

But it was at the 2000 Summer Olympics in Sydney when she stepped into the spotlight and became a household name. On a night when Cathy Freeman won gold, the Australian home audience had a real bonus in seeing Grigorieva jump a personal best and win silver. The ensuing fame saw Grigorieva take up a number of off-field commitments whilst still continuing to train and compete.

At the 2001 World Championships in Canada, competing against the odds due to an injury restricted campaign, Grigorieva equalled her personal best to claim fourth. In the final competition of the season, as she had done in the Olympics, she edged very close to the world record with a clearance of 4.56 m (a personal best jump) in Yokohama.

At her first Commonwealth Games in 2002, she went into the competition as the overwhelming favourite with enormous pressure on her. Grigorieva's goal was to win gold and set a new games record – she achieved both.

In 2003 and 2004, despite maintaining a high standard and a place amongst the world's best, injury, illness and the emotional strain of her marriage breakup, resulted in her missing opportunities to represent Australia in the World Championships and Olympics. In 2005, Grigorieva put all that behind her, changing her training regime, place of residence and focus in life. She had a successful season, making the finals of the World Championships and winning the Osaka Grand Prix to retain her Japanese record set in 2001.

In 2006 Grigorieva's focus was defending her title at the Commonwealth Games in front of her home crowd. The untimely, mysterious loss of her vaulting poles and a nagging hamstring injury days before the event saw her competing at a slight disadvantage. However, she walked away with a silver medal in a performance that was close to her very best. 2006 was clearly her best ever international season where she jumped over 4.5 m six times and recorded two new personal best heights within days of each other and regained a place in the top five.

Since 2000 Grigorieva has appeared in numerous television programs and ad campaigns and magazines and on a number of magazines covers including from Inside Sport and Black+White to GQ in Italy and Esquire in the UK.

Her practical experience and desire to help others is now backed by her continuing studies towards a Health Science degree at the Australian College of Natural Medicine. She also had completed qualifications in Reiki, Pilates and Yoga.

In November 2007, Grigorieva and her partner Plamen Milanov opened the "Caffe e Gelato Milany" on Racecourse Road in the Brisbane suburb of Hamilton.

In December 2008 Grigorieva was named international spokesperson for the fruit bar CheekyChewz manufactured by the Australian company Australian Food Innovators. Her first project has been arranging an initiative that will see 50 cents from every bar sold through Variety's website donated to that organisation.

== Achievements ==
Year	Competition	Venue	Position	Notes
1998	Goodwill Games	New York City	2nd	Pole vault
1998	Australian Championships		2nd	Pole vault
1999	Australian Championships		3rd	100 m
1999	Australian Championships		1st	Pole vault
1999	World Indoor Championships	Maebashi, Japan	9th	Pole vault
1999	World Championships	Seville	3rd	Pole vault
2000	Australian Championships		2nd	Pole vault
2000	Olympic Games	Sydney	2nd	Pole vault
2001	Australian Championships		1st	Pole vault
2001	Goodwill Games	Brisbane	3rd	Pole vault
2001	World Championships	Edmonton, Alberta	4th	Pole vault
2002	Australian Championships		1st	Pole vault
2002	Commonwealth Games	Manchester, England	1st	Pole vault
2003	Australian Championships		2nd	Pole vault
2006	Commonwealth Games	Melbourne	2nd	Pole vault
