= Alejandra García (pole vaulter) =

Argentine pole vaulter (born 1973)

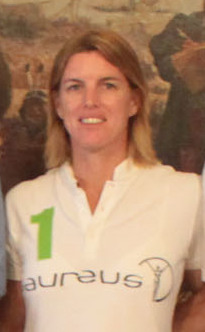
- Alejandra García in 2012

Personal information
- Born: June 13, 1973 (age 53) Buenos Aires, Argentina
Medal record
Athletics
Representing Argentina
South American Games
Gold medal – first place	1998 Cuenca	Pole vault

Alejandra García Flood (born June 13, 1973) is an Argentine pole vaulter.

== Career ==
Her personal best jump is 4.43 metres, which she achieved in April 2004 in Santa Fe. This is the current Argentine record, and was a South American record until 2005. She is a former high jumper, winning silver at the 1993 South American Championships. In 2000 and 2010 she won the Konex Award Merit Diploma as one of the five best athletes from each decade in Argentina.

== Competition record ==
Year	Competition	Venue	Position	Event	Notes
Representing Argentina
1990	South American Junior Championships	Bogotá, Colombia	2nd	High jump	1.65 m
1993	South American Championships	Lima, Peru	2nd	High jump	1.84 m
1993	South American Championships	Lima, Peru	4th	Long jump	5.81 m (w)
1994	Ibero-American Championships	Mar del Plata, Argentina	3rd	Long jump	6.13 m (+1.5 m/s)
1995	Pan American Games	Mar del Plata, Argentina	5th	Heptathlon	5139 pts
1995	South American Championships	Manaus, Brazil	1st	Pole vault	3.10 m
1995	South American Championships	Manaus, Brazil	4th	Heptathlon	4400 pts
1996	Ibero-American Championships	Medellín, Colombia	3rd	High jump	1.83 m
1996	Ibero-American Championships	Medellín, Colombia	5th	Long jump	6.16 m
1997	World Indoor Championships	Paris, France	–	Pole vault	NM
1997	South American Championships	Mar del Plata, Argentina	2nd	Pole vault	3.50 m
1998	Ibero-American Championships	Lisbon, Portugal	2nd	Pole vault	3.95 m
1998	South American Games	Cuenca, Ecuador	1st	Pole vault	4.05 m A
1999	South American Championships	Bogotá, Colombia	1st	Pole vault	4.30 m
1999	Pan American Games	Winnipeg, Canada	1st	Pole vault	4.30 m
1999	World Championships	Seville, Spain	11th	Pole vault	4.25 m
2000	Ibero-American Championships	Rio de Janeiro, Brazil	1st	Pole vault	4.30 m
2000	Olympic Games	Sydney, Australia	18th (q)	Pole vault	4.15 m
2001	South American Championships	Manaus, Brazil	–	4 × 100 m	DQ
2001	South American Championships	Manaus, Brazil	1st	Pole vault	4.00 m
2001	World Championships	Edmonton, Canada	21st (q)	Pole vault	4.25 m
2002	Ibero-American Championships	Guatemala City, Guatemala	1st	Pole vault	4.25 m
2003	South American Championships	Barquisimeto, Venezuela	1st	Pole vault	4.20 m
2003	World Championships	Paris, France	25th (q)	Pole vault	4.00 m
2004	Ibero-American Championships	Huelva, Spain	2nd	Pole vault	4.30 m
2004	Olympic Games	Athens, Greece	13th	Pole vault	4.20 m
2006	South American Championships	Tunja, Colombia	3rd	Pole vault	4.00 m
2007	South American Championships	São Paulo, Brazil	2nd	Pole vault	4.20 m
2007	Pan American Games	Rio de Janeiro, Brazil	4th	Pole vault	4.20 m
2008	Ibero-American	Iquique, Chile	3rd	Pole vault	4.00 m
2008	Olympic Games	Beijing, China	31st (q)	Pole vault	4.15 m
2009	South American Championships	Lima, Peru	3rd	Pole vault	4.10 m
2010	Ibero-American Championships	San Fernando, Spain	5th	Pole vault	4.10 m
2011	South American Championships	Buenos Aires, Argentina	–	Pole vault	NM
2011	Pan American Games	Guadalajara, Mexico	6th	Pole vault	4.20 m
