= Athletics at the 2000 Summer Olympics – Women's pole vault =

Women's pole vault at the Games of the XXVII Olympiad
- Venue: Stadium Australia
- Date: 23 – 25 September
- Competitors: 29 from 19 nations
- Winning height: 4.60 OR

Medalists
1st place, gold medalist(s)		Stacy Dragila	United States
2nd place, silver medalist(s)		Tatiana Grigorieva	Australia
3rd place, bronze medalist(s)		Vala Flosadóttir	Iceland

The women's pole vault event at the 2000 Summer Olympics in Sydney, Australia, was held on Monday, 25 September 2000. There were a total number of 30 participating athletes in this event, which made its Olympic debut. The qualifying round was held on Saturday, 23 September 2000, with the qualifying height set at 4.35 metres.

While the pole vault had been a standard Olympic event for a century, dating back to the first revival in 1896, this was the first time the event had been held for women.

The favorite coming into the event was world champion and world record holder Stacy Dragila, but the home favorite was Soviet transplant Australian Tatiana Grigorieva. At 4.55m these were the only two athletes still in the competition. Vala Flosadóttir, who had held the lead with a clean record to 4.50m, took the bronze medal, and set the National record while taking the only women's Olympic medal for Iceland to date. With Dragila's 4 misses in the competition, including one at 4.55m, Grigorieva had the lead. At 4.60m, Dragila reversed that with a clean clearance on her first attempt. Grigorieva was unable to match that and strategically moved to 4.65m, 2 cm higher than the world record Dragila had set in Sacramento in qualifying to the Olympics, to try to take the win. Neither competitor was able to clear 4.65m, Dragila took the gold and the Olympic record.

== Schedule ==
All times are Australian Eastern Standard Time (UTC+10)

Date	Time	Round
Saturday, 23 September 2000	18:00	Qualification
Monday, 25 September 2000	18:00	Final

== Records ==
Prior to the competition, the existing World record was as follows: As this was a new event in the Olympics, no previous Olympic record existed.

World record	Stacy Dragila (USA)	4.63 m	Sacramento, United States	23 July 2000
Olympic record	New Olympic event			

The following record(s) were established during the competition:

Date	Round	Name	Nationality	Result	Record
25 September	Final	Stacy Dragila	United States	4.60 m	OR

== Results ==
Key

- o = Height cleared
- x = Height failed
- – = Height passed
- r = Retired
- SB = Season's best
- PB = Personal best
- NR = National record
- AR = Area record
- OR = Olympic record
- WR = World record
- WL = World lead
- NM = No mark
- DNS = Did not start
- DQ = Disqualified

=== Qualifying round ===
Rule: Qualifying standard 4.35 (Q) or at least best 12 qualified (q).

Rank	Group	Name	Nationality	4.00	4.15	4.25	4.30	Result	Notes
1	B	Vala Flosadóttir	Iceland	o	o	o	o	4.30	q
1	B	Kellie Suttle	United States	o	o	o	o	4.30	q
1	A	Tatiana Grigorieva	Australia	–	o	o	o	4.30	q
1	A	Daniela Bártová	Czech Republic	o	–	o	o	4.30	q
1	A	Nicole Rieger-Humbert	Germany	–	o	–	o	4.30	q
1	A	Anzhela Balakhonova	Ukraine	–	–	–	o	4.30	q
7	B	Shuying Gao	China	o	o	xo	o	4.30	q
7	B	Elmarie Gerryts	South Africa	o	o	xo	o	4.30	q
7	B	Yvonne Buschbaum	Germany	–	xo	o	o	4.30	q
7	A	Marie Rasmussen	Denmark	o	xo	o	o	4.30	q, NR
11	A	Stacy Dragila	United States	–	o	o	xo	4.30	q
12	A	Monika Pyrek	Poland	o	o	xxo	xo	4.30	q
13	B	Doris Auer	Austria	–	o	xxo	xxo	4.30	q
14	B	Melissa Mueller	United States	o	o	o	xxx	4.25	
15	B	Emma George	Australia	–	o	xxo	xxx	4.25	
15	B	María del Mar Sánchez	Spain	o	o	xxo	xxx	4.25	
17	A	Caroline Ammel	France	o	o	xxx		4.15	
18	B	Marie Poissonnier	France	xo	o	xxx		4.15	
18	A	Alejandra García	Argentina	xo	o	xxx		4.15	
20	A	Janine Whitlock	Great Britain	xxo	o	xxx		4.15	
21	B	Déborah Gyurcsek	Uruguay	o	xxo	xxx		4.15	
22	B	Pavla Hamáčková	Czech Republic	o	–	xxx		4.00	
22	A	Þórey Edda Elísdóttir	Iceland	o	xxx			4.00	
–	B	Yelena Belyakova	Russia	–	xxx			NM	
–	A	Svetlana Feofanova	Russia	–	xxx			NM	
–	A	Zsuzsanna Szabo	Hungary	–	xxx			NM	
–	B	Katalin Donáth	Hungary	xxx				NM	
–	B	Thaila Iakovidou	Greece	xxx				NM	
–	A	Yelena Isinbayeva	Russia	xxx				NM	
–	A	Tanya Koleva	Bulgaria	xxx				NM	

=== Final ===
Rank	Name	Nationality	4.00	4.15	4.25	4.35	4.40	4.45	4.50	4.55	4.60	4.65	Result	Notes
1st place, gold medalist(s)	Stacy Dragila	United States	–	–	o	o	xo	o	xxo	xo	o	xxx	4.60	OR
2nd place, silver medalist(s)	Tatiana Grigorieva	Australia	–	xo	o	o	o	o	xo	o	x–	xx	4.55	PB
3rd place, bronze medalist(s)	Vala Flosadóttir	Iceland	o	o	o	o	o	o	o	xxx			4.50	NR
4	Daniela Bártová	Czech Republic	o	–	o	xxo	–	xxo	o	xxx			4.50	
5	Nicole Humbert	Germany	–	xxo	xxo	xxo	–	xxo	–	xxx			4.45	
6	Yvonne Buschbaum	Germany	–	–	xo	o	xo	xxx					4.40	
7	Monika Pyrek	Poland	xo	xxo	o	o	xo	xxx					4.40	NR
8	Marie Rasmussen	Denmark	o	o	o	o	xxx						4.35	NR
9	Doris Auer	Austria	–	–	o	xxx							4.25	
10	Gao Shuying	China	o	o	xxx								4.15	
11	Kellie Suttle	United States	o	xxx									4.00	
–	Anzhela Balakhonova	Ukraine	–	–	xxx								NM	
–	Elmarie Gerryts	South Africa	xx–										NM	

== See also ==
- 1998 Women's European Championships Pole Vault (Budapest)
- 1999 Women's World Championships Pole Vault (Seville)
- 2001 Women's World Championships Pole Vault (Edmonton)
- 2002 Women's European Championships Pole Vault (Munich)
