= Vala Flosadóttir =

Icelandic pole vaulter (born 1978)

Vala Flosadóttir (born 16 February 1978 in Reykjavík) is an Icelandic former athlete competing in the pole vault.

== Biography ==
She saw her heyday in the late nineties, when she set five world junior records and two world indoor records. She won various competitions, the greatest performance being the bronze at the 2000 Olympics with 4.50 metres, her lifetime best. She is the only woman from Iceland to win an Olympic medal.

== Achievements ==
Year	Competition	Venue	Position	Event	Notes
Representing Iceland
1995	Games of the Small States of Europe	Luxembourg City, Luxembourg	2nd	High jump	1.80 m
1996	European Indoor Championships	Stockholm, Sweden	1st	Pole vault	4.16 m
1997	World Indoor Championships	Paris, France	8th	Pole vault	4.00 m
1997	European Junior Championships	Ljubljana, Slovenia	2nd	Pole vault	4.00 m
1998	European Indoor Championships	Valencia, Spain	3rd	Pole vault	4.40 m
1998	Goodwill Games	Uniondale, United States	3rd	Pole vault	4.20 m
1998	European Championships	Budapest, Hungary	9th	Pole vault	4.15 m
1999	World Indoor Championships	Maebashi, Japan	2nd	Pole vault	4.45 m (iNR)
1999	European U23 Championships	Gothenburg, Sweden	1st	Pole vault	4.30 m
1999	World Championships	Seville, Spain	12th	Pole vault	4.25 m
2000	European Indoor Championships	Ghent, Belgium	4th	Pole vault	4.30 m
2000	Olympic Games	Sydney, Australia	3rd	Pole vault	4.50 m (NR)
2001	World Championships	Edmonton, Canada	23rd (q)	Pole vault	4.15 m
2002	European Indoor Championships	Vienna, Austria	9th (q)	Pole vault	4.30 m
2002	European Championships	Munich, Germany	22nd (q)	Pole vault	4.00 m
