= Yeoryia Tsiliggiri =

Greek pole vaulter

Yeoryia Tsiliggiri (Greek: Γεωργία Τσιλιγκίρη; born 21 June 1972 in Piraeus) is a retired Greek track and field athlete who specialised in the pole vault. She competed at the 2004 Summer Olympics in Athens without qualifying for the final.

She has personal bests of 4.47 metres outdoors (2004) and 4.37 metres indoors (2002).

== Competition record ==
Year	Competition	Venue	Position	Notes
Representing Greece
1998	European Indoor Championships	Valencia, Spain	19th (q)	3.80 m
1999	World Indoor Championships	Maebashi, Japan	17th	4.05 m
2001	Mediterranean Games	Radès, Tunisia	4th	3.80 m
2002	European Indoor Championships	Vienna, Austria	15th (q)	4.20 m
2004	World Indoor Championships	Budapest, Hungary	10th (q)	4.30 m
2004	Olympic Games	Athens, Greece	19th (q)	4.30 m
