= Anzhela Balakhonova =

Ukrainian pole vaulter (born 1972)

Personal information
- Born: 18 December 1972 (age 53) Shakhtarsk, Donetsk Oblast, Soviet Union

Sport
- Sport: Track and field
Medal record
Representing Ukraine
European Championships
Gold medal – first place	1998 Budapest	Pole vault
World Championships
Silver medal – second place	1999 Seville	Pole vault
European Indoor Championships
Gold medal – first place	1998 Valencia	Pole vault

Anzhela Anatoliyivna Balakhonova (Ukrainian: Анжела Анатоліївна Балахонова; born 18 December 1972) is a retired female pole vaulter from Ukraine who won the silver medal at the 1999 World Championships in Athletics. She held the European record, and formerly held the world indoor record. She finished 6th at the 2004 Summer Olympics.

== Achievements ==
Year	Competition	Venue	Position	Notes
Representing Ukraine
1996	European Indoor Championships	Stockholm, Sweden	7th	3.85 m
1997	Universiade	Catania, Italy	4th	4.10 m
1998	European Indoor Championships	Valencia, Spain	1st	4.45 m
1998	Goodwill Games	Uniondale, United States	4th	4.20 m
1998	European Championships	Budapest, Hungary	1st	4.31 m
1999	World Championships	Seville, Spain	2nd	4.55 m
2000	Olympic Games	Sydney, Australia	12th	NM
2001	World Indoor Championships	Lisbon, Portugal	–	NM
2001	World Championships	Edmonton, Canada	13th (q)	4.25 m
2004	Olympic Games	Athens, Greece	6th	4.40 m
2005	World Championships	Helsinki, Finland	20th (q)	4.15 m
