= Tanya Stefanova =

Bulgarian pole vaulter

Tanya Stefanova-Koleva (Bulgarian: Таня Стефанова; born March 8, 1972) is a female pole vaulter from Bulgaria, who represented her native country at two consecutive Summer Olympics, starting in 2000 in Sydney, Australia. She set her personal best (4.45 metres) on June 21, 2003 at a meet in Velenje.

== Achievements ==
Year	Competition	Venue	Position	Notes
Representing Bulgaria
1998	European Indoor Championships	Valencia, Spain	–	NM
1999	World Indoor Championships	Maebashi, Japan	20th (q)	4.05 m
2000	European Indoor Championships	Ghent, Belgium	20th (q)	3.80 m
2000	Olympic Games	Sydney, Australia	–	NM
2001	World Indoor Championships	Lisbon, Portugal	5th	4.35 m
2001	World Championships	Edmonton, Canada	17th (q)	4.25 m
2002	European Indoor Championships	Vienna, Austria	12th (q)	4.20 m
2002	European Championships	Munich, Germany	15th (q)	4.30 m
2003	World Indoor Championships	Birmingham, United Kingdom	6th	4.35 m
2003	World Championships	Paris, France	15th (q)	4.25 m
2004	Olympic Games	Athens, Greece	24th (q)	4.15 m
2005	European Indoor Championships	Madrid, Spain	8th	4.35 m
