= Athletics at the 2004 Summer Olympics – Women's pole vault =

Women's pole vault at the Games of the XXVIII Olympiad
- Venue: Olympic Stadium
- Date: 21–24 August
- Competitors: 35 from 22 nations
- Winning height: 4.91 m WR

Medalists
1st place, gold medalist(s)		Yelena Isinbayeva	Russia
2nd place, silver medalist(s)		Svetlana Feofanova	Russia
3rd place, bronze medalist(s)		Anna Rogowska	Poland

The women's pole vault competition at the 2004 Summer Olympics in Athens was held at the Olympic Stadium on 21–24 August. The winning margin was 16cm.

== Competition format ==
The competition consisted of two rounds, qualification and final. Athletes start with a qualifying round. Jumping in turn, each athlete attempts to achieve the qualifying height. If they fail at three jumps in a row, they are eliminated. After a successful jump, they receive three more attempts to achieve the next height. Once all jumps have been completed, all athletes who have achieved the qualifying height go through to the final. If fewer than 12 athletes achieve the qualifying standard, the best 12 athletes go through. Cleared heights reset for the final, which followed the same format until all athletes fail three consecutive jumps.

== Schedule ==
All times are Greece Standard Time (UTC+2)

Date	Time	Round
Saturday, 21 August 2004	19:00	Qualification
Tuesday, 24 August 2004	20:55	Final

== Records ==
Prior to the competition, the existing World and Olympic records were as follows.

World record	Yelena Isinbayeva (RUS)	4.90 m	London, United Kingdom	30 July 2004
Olympic record	Stacy Dragila (USA)	4.60 m	Sydney, Australia	25 September 2000

The following record was established during the competition:

Date	Event	Name	Nationality	Result	Record
24 August	Final	Yelena Isinbayeva	Russia	4.91 m	WR

== Results ==
Key

- o = Height cleared
- x = Height failed
- – = Height passed
- r = Retired
- SB = Season's best
- PB = Personal best
- NR = National record
- AR = Area record
- OR = Olympic record
- WR = World record
- WL = World lead
- NM = No mark
- DNS = Did not start
- DQ = Disqualified

=== Qualifying round ===
Rule: Qualifying standard 4.45 (Q) or at least best 12 qualified (q).

Rank	Group	Name	Nationality	3.80	4.00	4.15	4.30	4.40	4.45	Result	Notes
1	A	Monika Pyrek	Poland	-	-	o	o	x-	o	4.45	Q
2	A	Pavla Hamáčková	Czech Republic	-	-	o	xxo	-	xo	4.45	Q, SB
3	B	Anna Rogowska	Poland	-	-	xo	o	-	xxo	4.45	Q
4	A	Svetlana Feofanova	Russia	-	-	-	-	o	-	4.40	q
4	B	Kateřina Baďurová	Czech Republic	-	o	o	o	o	-	4.40	q
4	B	Dana Cervantes	Spain	-	-	o	o	o	-	4.40	q
4	B	Yelena Isinbayeva	Russia	-	-	-	-	o	-	4.40	q
8	A	Naroa Agirre	Spain	-	o	xo	o	o	-	4.40	q
8	B	Dana Ellis	Canada	-	-	o	xo	o	-	4.40	q
10	B	Þórey Edda Elísdóttir	Iceland	-	-	xo	xxo	o	-	4.40	q
11	B	Vanessa Boslak	France	-	-	o	o	xo	-	4.40	q
12	B	Alejandra García	Argentina	-	xo	o	o	xo	-	4.40	q
13	A	Anzhela Balakhonova	Ukraine	-	-	-	o	xxo	-	4.40	q
14	A	Stephanie McCann	Canada	-	-	o	xo	xxo	-	4.40	q, =SB
15	B	Silke Spiegelburg	Germany	xo	xo	o	o	xxo	-	4.40	q
16	B	Kym Howe	Australia	-	o	o	o	xxx		4.30	
17	B	Jillian Schwartz	United States	-	-	xxo	o	xxx		4.30	
18	A	Anastasiya Ivanova	Russia	-	-	o	xo	xx		4.30	
19	A	Stacy Dragila	United States	-	-	-	xo	xxx		4.30	
19	A	Krisztina Molnár	Hungary	-	o	o	xo	xxx		4.30	
19	A	Yeoryia Tsiliggiri	Greece	-	o	o	xo	xxx		4.30	
22	B	Carolin Hingst	Germany	-	-	o	xxo	xxx		4.30	
23	A	Zhao Yingying	China	-	o	xo	xxo	xxx		4.30	
24	A	Melina Hamilton	New Zealand	-	o	o	xxx			4.15	
24	A	Floé Kühnert	Germany	-	o	o	xxx			4.15	
24	A	Teja Melink	Slovenia	o	o	o	xxx			4.15	
24	A	Tanya Stefanova	Bulgaria	-	o	o	xxx			4.15	
24	A	Kellie Suttle	United States	-	-	o	xxx			4.15	
24	B	Anna Fitidou	Cyprus	o	o	o	xxx			4.15	
24	B	Nadine Rohr	Switzerland	-	o	o	xxx			4.15	
24	B	Gao Shuying	China	-	o	o	xxx			4.15	
32	B	Takayo Kondo	Japan	-	o	xxo	xxx			4.15	
33	A	Carolina Torres	Chile	-	xo	xxx				4.00	=SB
34	A	Marie Poissonnier	France	-	xxo	xxx				4.00	
	B	Afroditi Skafida	Greece	xxx						NM	

=== Final ===
Rank	Name	Nationality	4.00	4.20	4.40	4.55	4.65	4.70	4.75	4.80	4.85	4.90	4.91	Result	Notes
1st place, gold medalist(s)	Yelena Isinbayeva	Russia	-	-	o	o	o	x-	x-	o	o	-	o	4.91	WR
2nd place, silver medalist(s)	Svetlana Feofanova	Russia	-	-	o	o	o	o	xo	x-	x-	x		4.75	
3rd place, bronze medalist(s)	Anna Rogowska	Poland	-	o	o	xxo	o	o	xxx					4.70	
4	Monika Pyrek	Poland	-	o	o	o	xxx							4.55	
5	Þórey Edda Elísdóttir	Iceland	-	o	xxo	xo	xx-	x						4.55	
6	Vanessa Boslak	France	-	o	o	xxx								4.40	
6	Naroa Agirre	Spain	o	o	o	xxx								4.40	
6	Dana Ellis	Canada	-	o	o	xxx								4.40	
6	Anzhela Balakhonova	Ukraine	-	o	o	xxx								4.40	
10	Stephanie McCann	Canada	-	xo	o	xxx								4.40	=SB
11	Pavla Hamáčková	Czech Republic	o	o	xxo	xxx								4.40	
12	Kateřina Baďurová	Czech Republic	o	xo	xxx									4.20	
13	Silke Spiegelburg	Germany	o	xxo	xxx									4.20	
13	Alejandra García	Argentina	o	xxo	xxx									4.20	
	Dana Cervantes	Spain	-	xxx										NM	
