= Annika Becker =

German pole vaulter (born 1981)

Annika Becker (born 12 November 1981) is a retired German pole vaulter.

Becker was born in Rotenburg an der Fulda. Her personal best is 4.77 metres, achieved in July 2002 in Wattenscheid. This was the German national record until 12 July 2011.

== Achievements ==
Year	Competition	Venue	Position	Event	Notes
Representing Germany
1997	European Junior Championships	Ljubljana, Slovenia	1st	Pole vault	4.00
1999	European Junior Championships	Riga, Latvia	2nd	Pole vault	4.20
2000	World Junior Championships	Santiago, Chile	2nd	Pole vault	4.10 m
2001	European U23 Championships	Amsterdam, Netherlands	2nd	Pole vault	4.40 m
2002	European Indoors	Vienna, Austria	4th	Pole vault	4.55
2002	European Championships	Munich, Germany	5th	Pole vault	4.50
2002	World Cup	Madrid, Spain	1st	Pole vault	4.55
2003	World Indoors	Birmingham, England	5th	Pole vault	4.45
2003	World Championships	Paris, France	2nd	Pole vault	4.70, SB
2003	World Athletics Final	Monte Carlo, Monaco	6th	Pole vault	4.40

== See also ==
- Germany all-time top lists - Pole vault
