= María del Mar Sánchez =

Spanish pole vaulter

Personal information
- Full name: María del Mar Sánchez Gutiérrez
- Nationality: Spanish
- Born: 25 December 1979 (age 46) Ibiza, Spain

Sport
- Sport: Athletics
- Event: Pole vault
Medal record
Representing Spain
World Junior Championships
Silver medal – second place	1998 Annecy	Pole vault

María del Mar Sánchez Gutiérrez (born 25 December 1979) is a Spanish athlete. She competed in the women's pole vault at the 2000 Summer Olympics.
