= Caroline Ammel =

French pole vaulter

Personal information
- Nationality: France
- Born: 22 November 1973 (age 52) Le Blanc-Mesnil, Seine-Saint-Denis
- Height: 1.65 m (5 ft 5 in)

Sport
- Sport: Track and field
- Event: Pole vault

Caroline Ammel (born 22 November 1973 at Blanc-Mesnil) is a former French athlete, who specialized in the pole vault.

== Biography ==
She won three titles French National Pole Vault Championships: two Outdoor in 1995 and 2000, and one Indoors in 1996.

Caroline was the first female record holder for the pole vault (French records) vaulting 3.91 m (1994). She four times improved the national record: 4.16 m and 4.21 m in 1997, and 4.22 m and 4.23 m in 1998. Her personal best is 4.30 m (2000).

=== Prize list ===
- French Championships in Athletics :
  - winner of the pole vault in 1995 and 2000
- French Indoors Athletics Championships:
  - winner of the pole vault in 1996

=== Records ===
Event	Record	Location	Date
Pole vault	4.30 m	Bron	23 July 2000
Pole vault	4.30 m	Nice	5 August 2000

== Notes and references ==
- Fédération Française d'Athlétisme (2003), Docathlé 2003, Fédération française d'athlétisme, pp. 42, 116, 174, 213, 387, ISBN 2-9512343-3-3
