= Francesca Dolcini =

Italian pole vaulter

Personal information
- National team: Italy: 14 caps (1998-2005)
- Born: 28 December 1974 (age 51) Rome, Italy

Sport
- Sport: Athletics
- Event: Pole vault
- Club: ACSI Italia Atletica

Achievements and titles
- Personal best: Pole vault: 4.30 m (2002)

Francesca Dolcini (born 28 December 1974) is a former Italian female pole vaulter who won six national championships at individual senior level from 1995 to 2004.

== Biography ==
In the early 90s Francesca Dolcini was a pioneer of the specialty of the pole vault that was born at the female level in those years throughout the world. Her best result on the international senior level was the 9th place in the pole vault final at the 1998 European Athletics Indoor Championships held in Valencia.

She several times broke the national record of pole vault.

== Achievements ==
Year	Competition	Venue	Position	Event	Measure	Notes
1998	European Indoor Championships	(Spain) Valencia	9th	Pole vault	4.05 m	

== National titles ==
- Italian Athletics Championships
  - Pole vault: 2002 (1)
- Italian Athletics Indoor Championships
  - Pole vault: 1998, 1999, 2000, 2001, 2002 (5)
