= Kateřina Baďurová =

Czech pole vaulter and coach

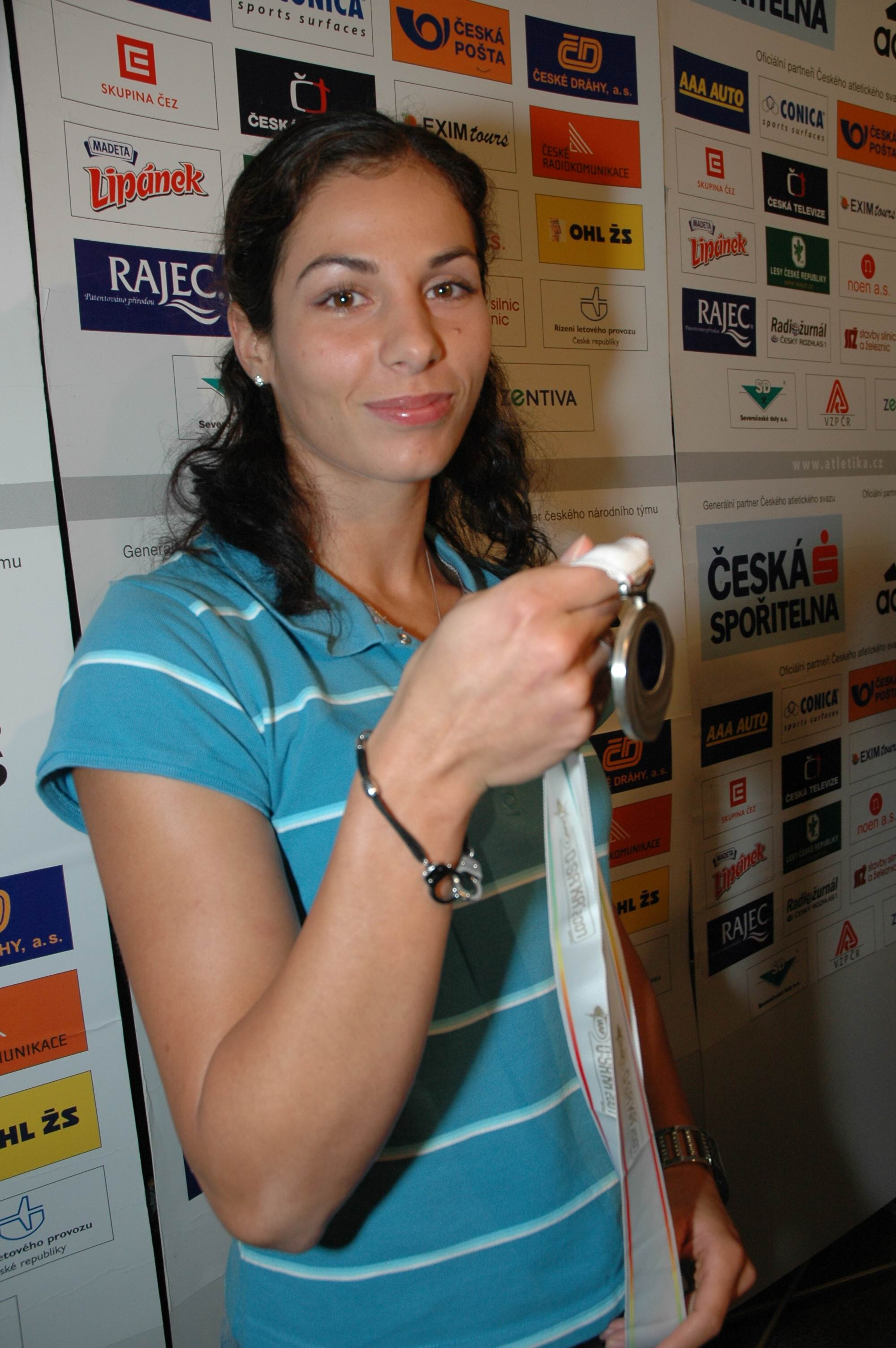
- Kateřina Baďurová and her silver medal from the 2007 World Championships

Personal information
- Nationality: Czech
- Born: 18 December 1982 (age 43) Ostrava, Czechoslovakia
- Height: 1.68 m (5 ft 6 in)
- Weight: 55 kg (121 lb)

Sport
- Country: Czech Republic
- Sport: Athletics
- Event: Pole vault
- Club: TJ Dukla Praha
- Coached by: Boleslav Patera

Achievements and titles
- Personal best: Pole vault: 4.75 m (2007)
Medal record
World Championships
Silver medal – second place	2007 Osaka	Pole vault

Kateřina Baďurová (Czech pronunciation: [ˈkatɛr̝ɪna ˈbaɟurovaː]; born 18 December 1982 in Ostrava), married Kateřina Janků, is a Czech former pole vaulter.

She finished twelfth at the 2004 Olympic Games. She also competed at the 2004 World Indoor Championships and the European Championships in 2002 and 2006 without reaching the finals.

Her best success came at the 2007 World Championships in Athletics in Osaka, Japan, where she took silver for 4.75 m vault, setting new Czech national record. She took early retirement from the sport due to a serious rupture of the ligament in her left knee. After retirement, she planned to continue in the field of child physiotherapy.

Since 2010 she works as an athletic head coach.

== Personal life ==
In 2010, Baďurová married Czech high jumper, Tomáš Janků. In 2007, Janků presented Baďurová with 465 roses at a press conference after she set a new national record in the pole vault of 465 cm. The pair have two daughters Ellen (born 2012) and Nikolet (born 2014).

She won StarDance, the Czech version of Dancing with the Stars, in 2012.
