= Balian Buschbaum =

German pole vaulter

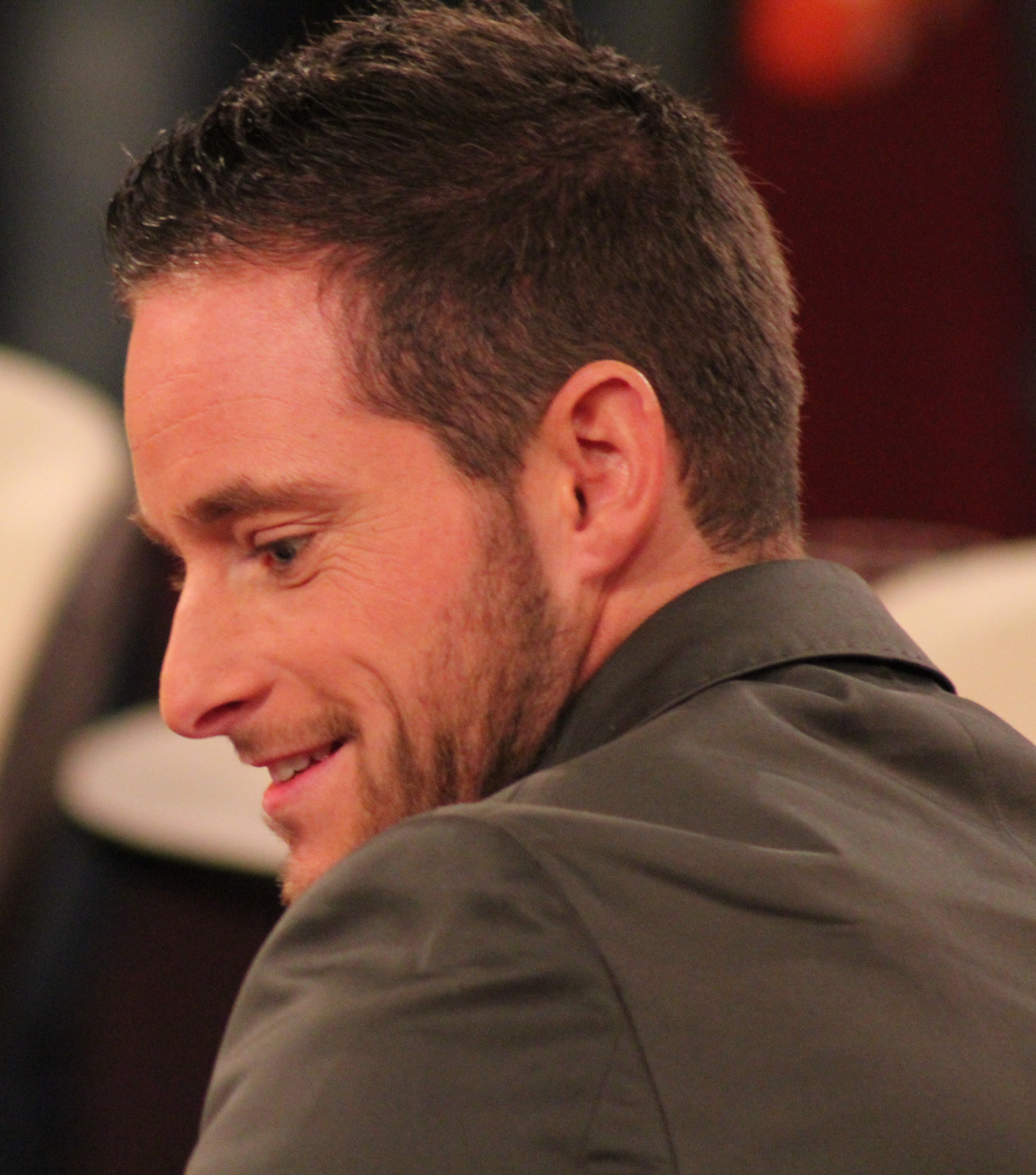
- Buschbaum in 2010

Personal information
- Nationality: German
- Born: Yvonne Buschbaum; 14 July 1980 (age 45) Ulm, West Germany

Sport
- Sport: Pole vaulting

Achievements and titles
- Personal best: 4.70 m
Medal record
Women's athletics
Representing Germany
European Championships
Bronze medal – third place	1998 Budapest	Pole vault
- Updated on 13 December 2014

Balian Buschbaum (born 14 July 1980) is a former German pole vaulter.

== Life and career ==
Buschbaum competed in women's pole vaulting before his gender transition, winning the title of German Youth Champion multiple times. In 1999 Buschbaum became the German pole vault champion, later that year setting the German record for pole vault with a height of 4.42 m, beating his previous junior world record of 4.37 m. His personal best is 4.70 metres, achieved in June 2003 in Ulm. On 21 November 2007 Buschbaum announced his retirement from the sport due to a persistent injury and the desire to begin gender reassignment. In January 2008, Buschbaum announced that his new first name was "Balian", after the blacksmith in the movie Kingdom of Heaven, and that he would undergo gender affirming surgery later that year.

Buschbaum worked until the end of the indoor 2012–2013 season as a high jump coach in Mainz.

== Achievements ==
All placements are for women's events and prior to his gender transition.

Year	Competition	Venue	Position	Notes
Representing Germany
1998	World Junior Championships	Annecy, France	4th	4.10 m
1998	European Championships	Budapest, Hungary	3rd	4.31 m
1999	World Championships	Seville, Spain	14th	4.15 m
1999	European Junior Championships	Riga, Latvia	1st	4.25 m
2000	Olympic Games	Sydney, Australia	6th	4.40 m
2001	World Indoor Championships	Lisbon, Portugal	6th	4.25 m
2001	World Championships	Edmonton, Canada	7th	4.45 m
2002	European Indoor Championships	Vienna, Austria	2nd	4.65 m
2002	European Championships	Munich, Germany	3rd	4.50 m
2003	World Championships	Paris, France	6th	4.50 m

== Works ==
- Blaue Augen bleiben blau. Mein Leben. (Blue Eyes Stay Blue. My Life) Krüger, Frankfurt 2010, ISBN 978-3-8105-2619-9.
- Frauen wollen reden, Männer Sex: wie verschieden sind wir wirklich, Herr Buschbaum? (Women Want to Talk, Men Want Sex: How Different are we Really, Mr. Buschbaum?) Fischer Taschenbuch, Frankfurt 2013, ISBN 978-3-596-19337-0.

== See also ==
- Germany all-time top lists - Pole vault
