= Anastasija Reiberger =

German pole vaulter

Anastasija Steinbeck
Personal information
- Born: Nastja Ryzhikh; 19 September 1977 (age 48) Omsk, Russian SFSR, Soviet Union

Sport
- Country: Germany
- Sport: Pole vault
Medal record
Women's Athletics
Representing Germany
World Indoor Championships
Gold medal – first place	1999 Maebashi	Pole vault

Anastasija Steinbeck (née Ryzhikh; born 19 September 1977 in Omsk) is a Russian-born German pole vaulter. She is the older sister of fellow pole vaulter Lisa Ryzih. Her greatest success was the gold medal in the 1999 World Indoor Championships.

Steinbeck's personal best is 4.63 metres (15.2 feet), achieved in July 2006 in Nürnberg. As of 2016, this ranks her tenth among German pole vaulters.

== Biography ==
After living in Russia as a child, father Vladimir Ryzhikh moved his family to the German city of Ulm in 1992. He was a pioneer of pole vault in Germany and introduced his children to the sport. Soon, his elder daughter "Nastja", as she was then called, flourished in this sport (like her younger sister Lisa Ryzih later), setting several junior records and participating for Germany after obtaining German citizenship when she was 18. For her German passport, her first name was transcribed in German ("Настя" = "Nastja"; "Nastya" in English transcription) and her family name in French ("Рыжих" = "Ryjikh"; "Ryzhikh" in English transcription)

Ryzhikh's greatest success was the gold medal in the 1999 world indoor championships in Maebashi. In 2000, she made headlines when she posed nude for the German Max lifestyle magazine. Unfortunately, she struggled with several injuries later, which caused her to decline. After some meagre years, she returned to the German elite by becoming German outdoor vice champion twice (2005, 2006).

In 2007, Ryjikh married. Long referred to as "Nastja Ryzhikh" (with countless name variations due to the unusual transcription), she decided to take on the last name of her husband and wanted to be officially referred to as "Anastasija", changing her name to Anastasija Steinbeck.

== Clubs ==
- SG Ulm (-1993)
- LAZ Zweibrücken (1993–99)
- ABC Ludwigshafen (1999–present)

== See also ==
- Germany all-time top lists - Pole vault
