= Pavla Rybová =

Czech pole vaulter

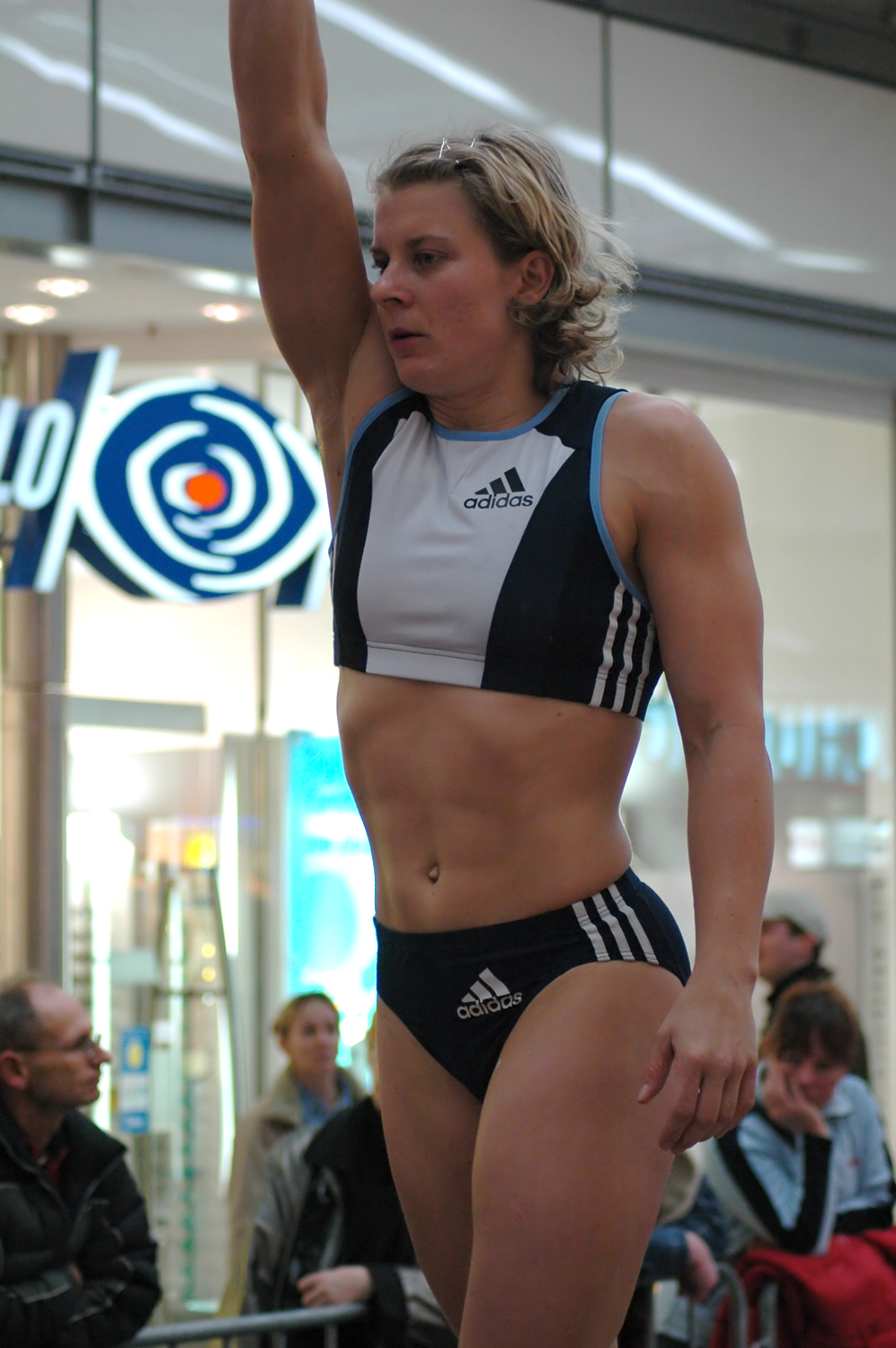
- Hamáčková in Potsdam, 2005

Personal information
- Born: 20 May 1978 (age 48) Chomutov, Czechoslovakia

Sport
- Sport: Track and field
Medal record
Representing Czech Republic
World Championships
Bronze medal – third place	2005 Helsinki	Pole vault
World Indoor Championships
Gold medal – first place	2001 Lisbon	Pole vault
Summer Universiade
Gold medal – first place	1999 Palma de Mallorca	Pole vault

Pavla Rybová (Czech pronunciation: [ˈpavla ˈrɪbovaː]; née Hamáčková; born 20 May 1978) is a Czech pole vaulter.

== Biography ==
She finished 11th place overall in the final of the 2004 Summer Olympics pole vault competition.

In 2001, she won the IAAF World Indoor Championships gold medal after securing a new games record of 4.56 metres.

In 2005, she won bronze at the World Championships in Finland.

Pavla Hamáčková married decathlete Jiří Ryba in 2006. On 14 February 2007 she improved Czech record to 464 cm in Bydgoszcz, Poland, only to be overcome just two hours later by Kateřina Baďurová's 465 cm in Prague, Czech Republic.
