= List of pole vault national champions (women) =

Below a list of all National Champions in the Women's Pole Vault (outdoor) in track and field from several countries since the mid-1990s.

== Argentina ==
- 1994: Mariana Falcioni
- 1995: Alejandra García
- 1996: Alejandra García
- 1997: Alejandra García
- 1998: Alejandra García
- 1999: Alejandra García
- 2000: Alejandra García
- 2001: Alejandra García
- 2002: Alejandra García
- 2003: Alejandra García
- 2004: Alejandra García
- 2005: Alejandra García
- 2006: Carolina Dalurzo

== Australia ==
- 1995: Emma George
- 1996: Melissa Harris
- 1997: Emma George
- 1998: Emma George
- 1999: Tatiana Grigorieva
- 2000: Emma George
- 2001: Jenni Dryburgh (NZL)
- 2002: Tatiana Grigorieva
- 2003: Melina Hamilton (NZL)
- 2004: Kym Howe
- 2005: Melina Hamilton (NZL)
- 2006: Tatiana Grigorieva
- 2007: Kym Howe
- 2008: Alana Boyd
- 2009: Alana Boyd
- 2010: Elizabeth Parnov
- 2011: Charmaine Lucock
- 2012: Vicky Parnov
- 2013: Alana Boyd
- 2014: Liz Parnov
- 2015: Alana Boyd

== Austria ==
- 1995: Monika Erlach
- 1996: Doris Auer
- 1997: Doris Auer
- 1998: Monika Erlach
- 1999: Doris Auer
- 2000: Doris Auer
- 2001: Michaela Kohlbauer
- 2002: Carmen Klausbruckner
- 2003: Carmen Klausbruckner
- 2004: Brigitta Pöll
- 2005: Doris Auer
- 2006: Carmen Klausbruckner

== Belgium ==
- 1995: Sophie Zubiolo
- 1996: Sophie Zubiolo
- 1997: Sophie Zubiolo
- 1998: Sophie Zubiolo
- 1999: Irena Dufour
- 2000: Liesbet Van Roie
- 2001: Caroline Goetghebuer
- 2002: Irena Dufour
- 2003: Karen Pollefeyt
- 2004: Irena Dufour
- 2005: Irena Dufour
- 2006: Karen Pollefeyt
- 2007: Karen Pollefeyt
- 2008: Fanny Smets
- 2009: Fanny Smets
- 2010: Fanny Smets
- 2011: Fanny Smets
- 2012: Chloé Henry
- 2013: Fanny Smets
- 2014: Chloé Henry
- 2015: Chloé Henry
- 2016: Fanny Smets

== Brazil ==
- 1995: Conceição Geremias
- 1996: Márcia Hennemann
- 1997: Miriam Schwuchow
- 1998: Patrícia Jiacomussi
- 1999: Joana Costa
- 2000: Karla da Silva
- 2001: Fabiana Murer
- 2002: Karla da Silva
- 2003: Karla da Silva
- 2004: Joana Costa
- 2005: Fabiana Murer
- 2006: Fabiana Murer
- 2007: Fabiana Murer
- 2008: Fabiana Murer
- 2009: Fabiana Murer
- 2010: Fabiana Murer
- 2011: Karla da Silva
- 2012: Karla da Silva
- 2013: Fabiana Murer
- 2014: Patrícia Gabriela dos Santos
- 2015: Fabiana Murer

== Bulgaria ==
- 1995: Tanya Koleva
- 1996: Not Held
- 1997: Tanya Koleva
- 1998: Iva Vasileva
- 1999: Vera Chavdarova
- 2000: Tanya Koleva
- 2001: Vera Chavdarova
- 2002: Vera Chavdarova
- 2003: Vera Chavdarova
- 2004: Vera Chavdarova
- 2005: Tanya Stefanova
- 2006: Vera Chavdarova

== Canada ==
- 1995: Rebecca Chambers
- 1996: Jackie Honey
- 1997: Trista Bernier
- 1998: Trista Bernier
- 1999: Rebecca Chambers
- 2000: Ardin Harrison
- 2001: Stephanie McCann
- 2002: Stephanie McCann
- 2003: Stephanie McCann
- 2004: Dana Ellis
- 2005: Dana Ellis
- 2006: Stephanie McCann
- 2007: Kelsie Hendry
- 2008: Kelsie Hendry
- 2010: Gabrielle Duclos-Lasnier
- 2011: Carly Dockendorf
- 2012: Lindsey Bergevin
- 2013: Heather Hamilton
- 2014: Lindsey Bergevin
- 2015: Kelsie Ahbe

== China ==
- 1989: Wu Weili
- 1990: Zhang Chunzhen
- 1991: Zhang Chunzhen
- 1992: Sun Caiyun
- 1993: Sun Caiyun
- 1994: Cai Weiyan
- 1995: Zhong Guiqing
- 1996: Sun Caiyun
- 1997: Cai Weiyan
- 1998: Cai Weiyan
- 1999: Sun Caiyun
- 2000: Gao Shuying
- 2001: Gao Shuying
- 2002: Gao Shuying
- 2003: Zhao Yingying
- 2004: Gao Shuying
- 2005: Zhao Yingying

== Czech Republic ==
- 1993: Daniela Bártová
- 1994: Daniela Bártová
- 1995: Daniela Bártová
- 1996: Daniela Bártová
- 1997: Daniela Bártová
- 1998: Daniela Bártová
- 1999: Pavla Hamácková
- 2000: Daniela Bártová
- 2001: Katerina Badurová
- 2002: Šárka Mládková
- 2003: Pavla Hamácková
- 2004: Katerina Badurová
- 2005: Pavla Hamácková
- 2006: Pavla Hamácková

== Denmark ==
- 1996: Marie Bagger Rasmussen
- 1997: Louise Brændstrup
- 1998: Marie Bagger Rasmussen
- 1999: Karen Klintø
- 2000: Anita Tørring
- 2001: Marie Bagger Rasmussen
- 2002: Marie Bagger Bohn (Rasmussen)
- 2003: Anita Tørring
- 2004: Anita Tørring
- 2005: Anita Tørring
- 2006: Iben Høgh-Pedersen
- 2007: Anita Tørring

== Estonia ==
- 1997: Margit Randver
- 1998: Merle Kivimets
- 1999: Margit Randver
- 2000: Merle Kivimets
- 2001: Margit Randver
- 2002: Margit Randver
- 2003: Kristin Karu
- 2004: Lea Saapar
- 2005: Kristina Ulitina
- 2006: Kristina Ulitina
- 2007: Lembi Vaher
- 2008: Lembi Vaher
- 2009: Lembi Vaher
- 2010: Lembi Vaher
- 2011: Reena Koll
- 2012: Lembi Vaher
- 2013: Lembi Vaher
- 2014: Reena Koll
- 2015: Reena Koll
- 2016: Getter Marie Lemberg
- 2017: Lembi Vaher
- 2018: Reena Koll
- 2019: Marleen Mülla
- 2020: Marleen Mülla
- 2021: Marleen Mülla
- 2022: Marleen Mülla

== Finland ==
- 1994: Birgitta Ivanoff
- 1995: Teija Saari
- 1996: Tiina Vilenius
- 1997: Teija Saari
- 1998: Teija Saari
- 1999: Teija Saari
- 2000: Annu Mäkelä
- 2001: Teija Saari
- 2002: Teija Saari
- 2003: Hanna Palamaa
- 2004: Saara Laaksonen
- 2005: Aino-Maija Karvinen
- 2006: Minna Nikkanen
- 2007: Minna Nikkanen
- 2008: Vanessa Vandy
- 2009: Minna Nikkanen
- 2010: Minna Nikkanen
- 2011: Minna Nikkanen
- 2012: Minna Nikkanen
- 2013: Minna Nikkanen
- 2014: Minna Nikkanen

== France ==
- 1995: Caroline Ammel
- 1996: Amandine Homo
- 1997: Aurore Pignot
- 1998: Amandine Homo
- 1999: Amandine Homo
- 2000: Caroline Ammel
- 2001: Vanessa Boslak
- 2002: Marie Poissonnier
- 2003: Vanessa Boslak
- 2004: Vanessa Boslak
- 2005: Vanessa Boslak
- 2006: Elisabete Tavares (POR)
- 2007: Vanessa Boslak
- 2008: Marion Buisson
- 2009: Sandra Ribeiro-Tavares

== Germany ==
- 1992: Daniela Köpernick
- 1993: Carmen Haage
- 1994: Andrea Müller
- 1995: Christine Adams
- 1996: Christine Adams
- 1997: Andrea Müller
- 1998: Sabine Schulte
- 1999: Yvonne Buschbaum
- 2000: Yvonne Buschbaum
- 2001: Annika Becker
- 2002: Annika Becker
- 2003: Yvonne Buschbaum
- 2004: Carolin Hingst
- 2005: Silke Spiegelburg
- 2006: Silke Spiegelburg
- 2007: Silke Spiegelburg
- 2008: Carolin Hingst
- 2009: Silke Spiegelburg
- 2010: Silke Spiegelburg
- 2011: Martina Strutz
- 2012: Silke Spiegelburg
- 2013: Martina Strutz
- 2014: Lisa Ryzih
- 2015: Lisa Ryzih

== Greece ==
- 1995: Yeoryia Tsiliggiri
- 1996: Paraskevi Koumbou
- 1997: Yeoryia Tsiliggiri
- 1998: Yeoryia Tsiliggiri
- 1999: Thaleia Iakovidou
- 2000: Yeoryia Tsiliggiri
- 2001: Yeoryia Tsiliggiri
- 2002: Yeoryia Tsiliggiri
- 2003: Anna Fitidou (CYP)
- 2004: Yeoryia Tsiliggiri
- 2005: Afroditi Skafida
- 2006: Antigoni Asteriou

== Hungary ==
- 1995: Zsuzsanna Szabó
- 1996: Zsuzsanna Szabó
- 1997: Eszter Szemerédi
- 1998: Zsuzsanna Szabó
- 1999: Zsuzsanna Szabó
- 2000: Zsuzsanna Szabó
- 2001: Krisztina Molnár
- 2002: Krisztina Molnár
- 2003: Zsuzsanna Szabó
- 2004: Krisztina Molnár
- 2005: Krisztina Molnár
- 2006: Krisztina Molnár

== Italy ==
- 1995: Maria Carla Bresciani
- 1996: Chiara Romana
- 1997: Maria Carla Bresciani
- 1998: Anna Tamburuni
- 1999: Maria Carla Bresciani
- 2000: Arianna Farfaletti Casali
- 2001: Maria Carla Bresciani
- 2002: Francesca Dolcini
- 2003: Arianna Farfaletti Casali
- 2004: Maria Carla Bresciani
- 2005: Sara Bruzzese
- 2006: Arianna Farfaletti Casali
- 2007: Anna Giordano Bruno
- 2008: Anna Giordano Bruno
- 2009: Anna Giordano Bruno
- 2010: Elena Scarpellini
- 2011: Anna Giordano Bruno
- 2012: Anna Giordano Bruno
- 2013: Giorgia Benecchi
- 2014: Roberta Bruni
- 2015: Sonia Malavisi
- 2016: Sonia Malavisi
- 2017: Elisa Molinarolo
- 2018: Roberta Bruni

== Japan ==
- 1995: Yayoi Suzuki
- 1996: Mami Nakano
- 1997: Mami Nakano
- 1998: Masumi Ono
- 1999: Masumi Ono
- 2000: Akane Eguchi
- 2001: Takayo Kondo
- 2002: Takayo Kondo
- 2003: Masumi Ono
- 2004: Takayo Kondo
- 2005: Takayo Kondo
- 2006: Mami Nakano
- 2007: Takayo Kondo
- 2008: Tomomi Abiko
- 2009: Takayo Kondo
- 2010: Tomomi Abiko
- 2011: Tomomi Abiko
- 2012: Tomomi Abiko
- 2013: Tatsuta Kanae
- 2014: Megumi Hamana
- 2015: Tatsuta Kanae
- 2016: Ayako Aoshima
- 2017: Tomomi Abiko
- 2018: Juri Nanbu
- 2019: Mayu Nasu

== Latvia ==
- 1996: Elīna Ringa (2,80m)
- 1997: Elīna Ringa
- 1998: Elīna Ringa
- 1999: Elīna Ringa
- 2000: Elīna Ringa (3,70m)
- 2001: Elīna Ringa
- 2002: Irēna Žauna
- 2003: Elīna Ringa
- 2004: Rita Obižajeva
- 2005: Alise Dimante
- 2006: Elīna Ringa
- 2007: Elīna Ringa
- 2008: Elīna Ringa
- 2009: Ildze Bortašķenoka
- 2010: Ildze Bortašķenoka

== Netherlands ==
- 1995: Marjolein Masclee
- 1996: Monique de Wilt
- 1997: Monique de Wilt
- 1998: Monique de Wilt
- 1999: Monique de Wilt
- 2000: Monique de Wilt
- 2001: Monique de Wilt
- 2002: Sandra van der Geer
- 2003: Sandra van der Geer
- 2004: Monique de Wilt
- 2005: Rianna Galiart
- 2006: Rianna Galiart
- 2007: Rianna Galiart
- 2008: Rianna Galiart
- 2009: Rianna Galiart
- 2010: Denise Groot
- 2011: Denise Groot
- 2012: Rianna Galiart
- 2013: Rianna Galiart
- 2014: Rianna Galiart
- 2015: Femke Pluim
- 2016: Femke Pluim

== New Zealand ==
- 1992: Melina Hamilton
- 1993: Melina Hamilton
- 1994: Melina Hamilton
- 1995: Emily Marshall
- 1996: Cassandra Kelly
- 1997: Melina Hamilton
- 1998: Jenni Dryburgh
- 1999: Melina Hamilton
- 2000: Melina Hamilton
- 2001: Jenni Dryburgh
- 2002: Melina Hamilton
- 2003: Melina Hamilton
- 2004: Melina Hamilton
- 2005: Melina Hamilton
- 2006: Melina Hamilton
- 2007: Melina Hamilton
- 2008: Melina Hamilton
- 2009: Julia Hart
- 2010: Julia Hart
- 2011: Kerry Charlesworth
- 2012: Lucy McGall
- 2013: Valerie Chan
- 2014: Kerry Charlesworth
- 2015: Eliza McCartney
- 2016: Eliza McCartney

== Poland ==
- 1995: Anna Skrzyńska
- 1996: Anna Wielgus
- 1997: Anna Wielgus
- 1998: Anna Wielgus
- 1999: Monika Pyrek
- 2000: Monika Pyrek
- 2001: Monika Pyrek
- 2002: Monika Pyrek
- 2003: Agnieszka Wrona
- 2004: Monika Pyrek
- 2005: Monika Pyrek
- 2006: Monika Pyrek
- 2007: Monika Pyrek
- 2008: Monika Pyrek
- 2009: Anna Rogowska
- 2010: Monika Pyrek
- 2011: Anna Rogowska
- 2012: Monika Pyrek
- 2013: Anna Rogowska
- 2014: Anna Rogowska
- 2015: Justyna Śmietanka
- 2016: Justyna Śmietanka
- 2017: Justyna Śmietanka
- 2018: Justyna Śmietanka
- 2019: Kamila Przybyła

== Portugal ==
- 1995: Sónia Machado
- 1996: Cristina Santos Almeida
- 1997: Ana Marisa Vieira
- 1998: Tânia Costa
- 1999: Ana Marisa Vieira
- 2000: Ana Marisa Vieira
- 2001: Elisabete Tavares
- 2002: Sandra Helena Tavares
- 2003: Elisabete Tavares
- 2004: Elisabete Tavares
- 2005: Elisabete Tavares
- 2006: Elisabete Tavares
- 2007: Sandra Helena Tavares
- 2008: Sandra Helena Tavares
- 2009: Maria Leonor Tavares
- 2010: Sandra Helena Tavares
- 2011: Maria Leonor Tavares
- 2012: Maria Leonor Tavares

== Russia ==
- 1993: Svetlana Abramova
- 1994: Svetlana Abramova
- 1995: Marina Andreyeva
- 1996: Marina Andreyeva
- 1997: Svetlana Abramova
- 1998: Yelena Belyakova
- 1999: Yelena Belyakova
- 2000: Yelena Belyakova
- 2001: Svetlana Feofanova
- 2002: Yelena Isinbayeva
- 2003: Yelena Belyakova
- 2004: Anastasiya Ivanova
- 2005: Tatyana Polnova
- 2006: Svetlana Feofanova
- 2007: Svetlana Feofanova
- 2008: Svetlana Feofanova
- 2009: Yuliya Golubchikova
- 2010: Yuliya Golubchikova

== South Africa ==
- 1995: Elmarie Gerryts
- 1996: Elmarie Gerryts
- 1997: Elmarie Gerryts
- 1998: Elmarie Gerryts
- 1999: Elmarie Gerryts
- 2000: Elmarie Gerryts
- 2001: Elmarie Gerryts
- 2002: Annelie van Wyk
- 2003: Samantha Dodd
- 2004: Samantha Dodd
- 2005: Lindi Roux
- 2006: Samantha Dodd

== Spain ==
- 1995: Dana Cervantes
- 1996: Naiara Larrea
- 1997: Esther Auyanet
- 1998: Mar Sánchez
- 1999: Dana Cervantes
- 2000: Mar Sánchez
- 2001: Mar Sánchez
- 2002: Dana Cervantes
- 2003: Naroa Agirre
- 2004: Dana Cervantes
- 2005: Mar Sánchez
- 2006: Naroa Agirre
- 2007: Naroa Agirre
- 2008: Naroa Agirre
- 2009: Naroa Agirre
- 2010: Naroa Agirre
- 2011: Ana María Pinero
- 2012: Ana María Pinero

== Sweden ==
- 1996: Alissa White
- 1997: Alissa White
- 1998: Charlotte Karlsson
- 1999: Hanna-Mia Persson
- 2000: Malin Ericsson
- 2001: Kirsten Belin
- 2002: Kirsten Belin
- 2003: Linda Persson
- 2004: Linda Persson
- 2005: Hanna-Mia Persson
- 2006: Linda Persson

== Ukraine ==
- 1992: not contested
- 1993: not contested
- 1994: not contested
- 1995: not contested
- 1996: Anzhela Balakhonova
- 1997: Anzhela Balakhonova
- 1998: Lyudmyla Prykhodko
- 1999: Anzhela Balakhonova
- 2000: Anzhela Balakhonova
- 2001: Anzhela Balakhonova
- 2002: Yevgeniya Katkova
- 2003: Natalya Kushch
- 2004: Anzhela Balakhonova
- 2005: Anzhela Balakhonova
- 2006: Alevtina Ruyeva
- 2007: Natalya Mazuryk
- 2008: Natalya Mazuryk
- 2009: Alevtina Ruyeva
- 2010: Oksana Petrenko
- 2011: Kseniya Chertkoshvili
- 2012: Natalya Mazuryk
- 2013: Kateryna Kozlova
- 2014: Hanna Shelekh
- 2015: Maryna Kylypko
- 2016: Maryna Kylypko
- 2017: Maryna Kylypko
- 2018: Maryna Kylypko
- 2019: Maryna Kylypko
- 2020: Maryna Kylypko
- 2021: Maryna Kylypko
- 2022: Yana Hladiychuk
- 2023: Yana Hladiychuk
- 2024: Yana Hladiychuk
- 2025: Maryna Kylypko
- 2026: Maryna Kylypko

== United States ==
- 1994: Melissa Price
- 1995: Melissa Price
- 1996: Stacy Dragila
- 1997: Stacy Dragila
- 1998: Kellie Suttle
- 1999: Stacy Dragila
- 2000: Stacy Dragila
- 2001: Stacy Dragila
- 2002: Stacy Dragila
- 2003: Stacy Dragila
- 2004: Stacy Dragila
- 2005: Stacy Dragila
- 2006: Jennifer Stuczynski
- 2007: Jennifer Stuczynski
- 2008: Jennifer Stuczynski
- 2009: Jennifer Stuczynski
- 2010: Jenn Suhr
- 2011: Kylie Hutson
- 2012: Jenn Suhr
- 2013: Jenn Suhr
- 2014: Jenn Suhr
- 2015: Jenn Suhr
- 2016: Jenn Suhr
- 2017: Sandi Morris
- 2018: Sandi Morris
- 2019: Sandi Morris

== See also ==
- List of pole vault national champions (men)
