= Zhong Guiqing =

Chinese pole vaulter

Zhong Guiqing (Chinese: 钟桂清; born 5 July 1977) is a Chinese former track and field athlete who competed in the pole vault. Her best of 4.15 m (13 ft 7 1/4 in) is a former world record. She was a one-time Chinese national champion.

Zhong was active in the early history of women's pole vaulting, starting to achieve results at national level in 1994 – five years before the women's event first featured at the World Championships in Athletics. Her best vault of 1994 was 3.80 m (12 ft 5 1/2 in), which placed her in the top twenty globally for the developing discipline that season. She cleared a height of 4.08 m (13 ft 4 1/2 in) to win at the Chinese Athletics Championships in 1995 and this was a women's pole vault world record, bettering by three centimetres the mark set by Sun Caiyun at the same competition three years earlier. Both Sun and Zhong achieved the same mark that day, with Zhong taking the championship title on count-back rules. The International Association of Athletics Federations only began ratifying women's pole vault world records in 1992 and Zhong's mark made her China's second consecutive record holder in the event.

Zhong's record lasted only three days, as Daniela Bártová of the Czech Republic began a string of records in the event that year, with a total of ten record jumps culminating in a height of 4.22 m (13 ft 10 in). Reflecting the growing popularity of the sport, Zhong was one of five women to hold the world record that season, alongside Sun, Bártová, Andrea Müller and Emma George. Zhong eventually ranked sixth globally for the season in 1995, and third among Chinese athletes behind Sun and Cai Weiyan.

She improved her bests in 1996, managing 4.03 m (13 ft 2 1/2 in) indoors in Karlsruhe in February and then a lifetime best of 4.15 m (13 ft 7 1/4 in) in national competition in October. Despite her improvements, the sport was being pushed to new heights at the same time and George's world record reached 4.45 m (14 ft 7 in) that July. Zhong was again behind her national rivals Sun and Cai, though her season's best height placed her equal eighth on the global rankings for the year. Zhong's last vault over four metres came in the 1997, but she dropped out of the world top twenty. She continued to compete until 2001, at which point her career came to a close.

== National titles ==
- Chinese Athletics Championships
  - Pole vault: 1995

Records
Preceded by Sun Caiyun	Women's pole vault world record holder 18 May 1995–21 May 1995	Succeeded by Daniela Bártová
