= 1997 IAAF World Indoor Championships – Women's pole vault =

The women's pole vault event at the 1997 IAAF World Indoor Championships was held on March 8–9. It was the first time that this event was contested by women at the World Indoor Championships.

== Medalists ==
Gold	Silver	Bronze
Stacy Dragila; United States	Emma George; Australia	Cai Weiyan; China

== Results ==
=== Qualification ===
Qualification: 4.10 (Q) or at least 12 best performers (q) qualified for the final.

Rank	Group	Athlete	Nationality	3.50	3.70	3.90	4.00	4.10	Result	Notes
1	A	Daniela Bártová	Czech Republic	–	o	o	–	o	4.10	Q
1	B	Emma George	Australia	–	–	–	o	o	4.10	Q
3	A	Sun Caiyun	China	–	o	xo	xxo	o	4.10	Q
4	A	Svetlana Abramova	Russia	–	–	xo	o	xo	4.10	Q
5	A	Eszter Szemerédi	Hungary	–	–	o	o	xxx	4.00	q
5	B	Cai Weiyan	China	–	o	o	o	–	4.00	q
7	B	Anzhela Balakhonova	Ukraine	–	–	xo	o	x–	4.00	q
7	B	Stacy Dragila	United States	–	o	xo	o	–	4.00	q
9	A	Amandine Homo	France	–	o	xxo	o	xxx	4.00	q, =NR
9	B	Maria Carla Bresciani	Italy	–	xo	xo	o	x–	4.00	q, NR
11	A	Vala Flosadóttir	Iceland	–	o	o	xo	xxx	4.00	q
12	B	Zsuzsanna Szabó	Hungary	–	o	o	xxx		3.90	q
13	B	Yelena Belyakova	Russia	–	xxo	o	xxx		3.90	
14	A	Gabriela Mihalcea	Romania	–	o	xo	xxx		3.90	
14	B	Sophie Zubiolo	Belgium	o	o	xo	xxx		3.90	=NR
16	A	Sabine Schulte	Germany	xo	o	xxo	xxx		3.90	
16	B	Rhian Clarke	Great Britain	xo	o	xxo	xxx		3.90	=NR
18	A	Doris Auer	Austria	o	o	xxx			3.70	
18	A	Janine Whitlock	Great Britain	o	o	xxx			3.70	
18	B	Šárka Mládková	Czech Republic	–	o	xxx			3.70	
21	B	Dana Cervantes	Spain	xo	o	xxx			3.70	
22	A	Melissa Price	United States	–	xo	xxx			3.70	
22	A	Anita Tomulevski	Norway	o	xo	xxx			3.70	
22	B	Cassandra Kelly	New Zealand	o	xo	xxx			3.70	
22	B	Nicole Rieger	Germany	–	xo	xxx			3.70	
26	B	Lynda Méziani	France	xo	xxo	xxx			3.70	
27	A	Trista Bernier	Canada	o	xxx				3.50	
	A	Alejandra García	Argentina						NM	

=== Final ===
Rank	Name	Nationality	3.70	3.90	4.00	4.10	4.20	4.25	4.30	4.35	4.40	4.45	Result	Notes
1st place, gold medalist(s)	Stacy Dragila	United States	–	o	o	o	xo	o	o	xxo	xo	xxx	4.40	WR
2nd place, silver medalist(s)	Emma George	Australia	–	–	o	–	o	–	xo	o	xx–	x	4.35	
3rd place, bronze medalist(s)	Cai Weiyan	China	o	o	o	xo	o	o	xxo	o	xxx		4.35	AR
4	Sun Caiyun	China	o	o	o	o	o	x–	xx				4.20	
5	Daniela Bártová	Czech Republic	o	o	–	xo	xo	xxx					4.20	
6	Svetlana Abramova	Russia	–	xxo	–	o	xxx						4.10	
7	Eszter Szemerédi	Hungary	–	o	–	xo	xxx						4.10	
8	Vala Flosadóttir	Iceland	o	o	o	xxx							4.00	
9	Anzhela Balakhonova	Ukraine	–	o	xo	xxx							4.00	
10	Amandine Homo	France	o	o	xxx								3.90	
11	Zsuzsanna Szabó	Hungary	xo	xxx									3.70	
	Maria Carla Bresciani	Italy											NM	
