= Athletics at the 2002 Asian Games – Women's pole vault =

Women's pole vault at the 2002 Asian Games
- Venue: Busan Asiad Main Stadium
- Date: 9 October 2002
- Competitors: 7 from 5 nations

Medalists
gold medal	Gao Shuying	China
silver medal	Masumi Ono	Japan
bronze medal	Qin Xia	China

The women's pole vault competition at the 2002 Asian Games in Busan, South Korea was held on 9 October at the Busan Asiad Main Stadium.

== Schedule ==
All times are Korea Standard Time (UTC+09:00)

Date	Time	Event
Wednesday, 9 October 2002	09:30	Final

== Records ==
Prior to this competition, the existing world, Asian and Games records were as follows.

World Record	Stacy Dragila (USA)	4.81	Palo Alto, United States	9 June 2001
Asian Record	Gao Shuying (CHN)	4.52	Beijing, China	29 August 2001
Games Record	Cai Weiyan (CHN); Masumi Ono (JPN); Sun Caiyun (CHN)	4.00	Bangkok, Thailand; Bangkok, Thailand; Bangkok, Thailand	19 December 1998; 19 December 1998; 19 December 1998

== Results ==
Legend

- NM — No mark

Rank	Athlete	Attempt										Result	Notes
Rank	Athlete	3.20	3.40	3.50	3.60	3.70	3.80	3.90	3.95	4.00	4.05	Result	Notes
Rank	Athlete	4.10	4.15	4.20	4.25	4.30	4.35	4.40	4.45			Result	Notes
1st place, gold medalist(s)	Gao Shuying (CHN)	–	–	–	–	–	–	–	–	–	O	4.35	GR
1st place, gold medalist(s)	Gao Shuying (CHN)	–	O	–	O	–	XO	–	XXX			4.35	GR
2nd place, silver medalist(s)	Masumi Ono (JPN)	–	–	–	–	–	–	O	–	O	–	4.10	
2nd place, silver medalist(s)	Masumi Ono (JPN)	O	–	–	XXX							4.10	
3rd place, bronze medalist(s)	Qin Xia (CHN)	–	–	–	–	–	O	O	–	XXO	–	4.00	
3rd place, bronze medalist(s)	Qin Xia (CHN)	XXX										4.00	
4	Takayo Kondo (JPN)	–	–	–	–	–	XO	–	–	XXO	–	4.00	
4	Takayo Kondo (JPN)	XXX										4.00	
5	Ni Putu Desi Margawati (INA)	–	–	–	–	–	O	XXX				3.80	
6	Chang Ko-hsin (TPE)	–	–	–	XO	–	XO	–	–	XXX		3.80	
—	Kim Ji-na (KOR)	XXX										NM	
