= Women's pole vault indoor world record progression =

The following is the women's pole vault indoor world record progression starting from 1994.

== IAAF record progression ==
Record	Athlete	Nation	Venue	Date
4.08 m (13 ft 4 1/2 in)	Nicole Rieger	Germany	Karlsruhe	1.03.1994
=4.08 m (13 ft 4 1/2 in)	Sun Caiyun	China	Karlsruhe	1.03.1994
4.10 m (13 ft 5 1/4 in)	Sun Caiyun	China	Zweibrücken	27.01.1995
4.11 m (13 ft 5 3/4 in)	Sun Caiyun	China	Pulheim	3.02.1995
4.12 m (13 ft 6 in)	Sun Caiyun	China	Berlin	10.02.1995
4.13 m (13 ft 6 1/2 in)	Sun Caiyun	China	Karlsruhe	12.02.1995
4.15 m (13 ft 7 1/4 in)	Sun Caiyun	China	Erfurt	15.02.1995
4.20 m (13 ft 9 1/4 in)	Daniela Bártová	Czech Republic	Prague	24.01.1996
4.21 m (13 ft 9 1/2 in)	Sun Caiyun	China	Landau	28.01.1996
4.22 m (13 ft 10 in)	Sun Caiyun	China	Erfurt	31.01.1996
=4.22 m (13 ft 10 in)	Daniela Bártová	Czech Republic	Erfurt	31.01.1996
4.27 m (14 ft 0 in)	Sun Caiyun	China	Erfurt	31.01.1996
4.28 m (14 ft 1/2 in)	Sun Caiyun	China	Tianjin	27.02.1996
4.30 m (14 ft 1 1/4 in)	Emma George	Australia	Melbourne	10.12.1996
4.40 m (14 ft 5 in)	Emma George	Australia	Melbourne	10.12.1996
=4.40 m (14 ft 5 in)	Stacy Dragila	United States	Paris	9.03.1997
4.41 m (14 ft 5 1/2 in)	Daniela Bártová	Czech Republic	Erfurt	4.02.1998
4.42 m (14 ft 6 in)	Vala Flosadóttir	Iceland	Bielefeld	6.02.1998
4.43 m (14 ft 6 1/4 in)	Daniela Bártová	Czech Republic	Prague	14.02.1998
4.44 m (14 ft 6 3/4 in)	Vala Flosadóttir	Iceland	Eskilstuna	14.02.1998
4.45 m (14 ft 7 in)	Anzhela Balakhonova	Ukraine	Valencia	1.03.1998
4.46 m (14 ft 7 1/2 in)	Daniela Bártová	Czech Republic	Berlin	6.03.1998
4.47 m (14 ft 7 3/4 in)	Emma George	Australia	Adelaide	7.03.1998
4.48 m (14 ft 8 1/4 in)	Stacy Dragila	United States	Sindelfingen	8.03.1998
=4.48 m (14 ft 8 1/4 in)	Daniela Bártová	Czech Republic	Sindelfingen	8.03.1998
4.50 m (14 ft 9 in)	Emma George	Australia	Adelaide	26.03.1998
4.55 m (14 ft 11 in)	Emma George	Australia	Adelaide	26.03.1998
4.56 m (14 ft 11 1/2 in)	Nicole Humbert	Germany	Stockholm	25.02.1999
4.57 m (14 ft 11 3/4 in)	Stacy Dragila	United States	Pocatello	19.02.2000
4.61 m (15 ft 1 1/4 in)	Stacy Dragila	United States	Pocatello	19.02.2000
4.62 m (15 ft 1 3/4 in)	Stacy Dragila	United States	Atlanta	3.03.2000
4.63 m (15 ft 2 1/4 in)	Stacy Dragila	United States	New York City	2.02.2001
4.65 m (15 ft 3 in)	Stacy Dragila	United States	Pocatello	10.02.2001
4.64 m (15 ft 2 1/2 in)	Svetlana Feofanova	Russia	Dortmund	11.02.2001
4.66 m (15 ft 3 1/4 in)	Stacy Dragila	United States	Pocatello	17.02.2001
4.70 m (15 ft 5 in)	Stacy Dragila	United States	Pocatello	17.02.2001
4.71 m (15 ft 5 1/4 in)	Svetlana Feofanova	Russia	Stuttgart	3.02.2002
4.72 m (15 ft 5 3/4 in)	Svetlana Feofanova	Russia	Stockholm	6.02.2002
4.73 m (15 ft 6 in)	Svetlana Feofanova	Russia	Gent	10.02.2002
4.74 m (15 ft 6 1/2 in)	Svetlana Feofanova	Russia	Liévin	24.02.2002
4.75 m (15 ft 7 in)	Svetlana Feofanova	Russia	Wien	3.03.2002
4.76 m (15 ft 7 1/4 in)	Svetlana Feofanova	Russia	Glasgow	2.02.2003
4.77 m (15 ft 7 3/4 in)	Svetlana Feofanova	Russia	Birmingham	21.02.2003
4.78 m (15 ft 8 in)	Stacy Dragila	United States	Boston	2.03.2003
4.80 m (15 ft 8 3/4 in)	Svetlana Feofanova	Russia	Birmingham	16.03.2003
4.81 m (15 ft 9 1/4 in)	Yelena Isinbaeva	Russia	Donetsk	15.02.2004
4.83 m (15 ft 10 in)	Yelena Isinbaeva	Russia	Donetsk	15.02.2004
4.85 m (15 ft 10 3/4 in)	Svetlana Feofanova	Russia	Athína	22.02.2004
4.86 m (15 ft 11 1/4 in)	Yelena Isinbaeva	Russia	Budapest	6.03.2004
4.87 m (15 ft 11 1/2 in)	Yelena Isinbaeva	Russia	Donetsk	12.02.2005
4.88 m (16 ft 0 in)	Yelena Isinbaeva	Russia	Birmingham	18.02.2005
4.89 m (16 ft 1/2 in)	Yelena Isinbaeva	Russia	Liévin	26.02.2005
4.90 m (16 ft 3/4 in)	Yelena Isinbaeva	Russia	Madrid	6.03.2005
4.91 m (16 ft 1 1/4 in)	Yelena Isinbaeva	Russia	Donetsk	12.02.2006
4.93 m (16 ft 2 in)	Yelena Isinbaeva	Russia	Donetsk	10.02.2007
4.95 m (16 ft 2 3/4 in)	Yelena Isinbaeva	Russia	Donetsk	16.02.2008
4.97 m (16 ft 3 1/2 in)	Yelena Isinbaeva	Russia	Donetsk	15.02.2009
5.00 m (16 ft 4 3/4 in)	Yelena Isinbaeva	Russia	Donetsk	15.02.2009
5.01 m (16 ft 5 in)	Yelena Isinbaeva	Russia	Stockholm	23.02.2012
5.02 m (16 ft 5 1/2 in)	Jennifer Suhr	United States	Albuquerque	2.03.2013
5.03 m (16 ft 6 in)	Jennifer Suhr	United States	Brockport	30.01.2016

== See also ==
- Women's pole vault world record progression
- Men's pole vault indoor world record progression
- List of pole vaulters who reached 5 metres
