= Ringa =

Ringa may refer to:

- Ringa Ropo-Junnila (born 1966), Finnish long jumper
- Ringa (surname), a Latvian surname
- Lepidochrysops ringa, a species of butterfly
- Ringa Monastery, a Buddhist monastery

== See also ==
- Ringa Linga, a 2013 song by Taeyang
- Ringa Ringa, a 2010 Marathi-language film
- Ringer (disambiguation)
