= Athletics at the 2002 Commonwealth Games – Women's pole vault =

Women's pole vault at the Commonwealth Games

The women's pole vault event at the 2002 Commonwealth Games was held on 28–29 July.

== Medalists ==
Gold	Silver	Bronze
Tatiana Grigorieva; Australia	Kym Howe; Australia	Irie Hill; England; Bridgid Isworth; Australia; Stephanie McCann; Canada

== Results ==
=== Qualification ===
Qualification: 4.10 m (Q) or at least 12 best (q) qualified for the final.

Rank	Group	Athlete	Nationality	3.50	3.60	3.70	3.80	3.90	4.00	Result	Notes
1	A	Tatiana Grigorieva	Australia	–	–	–	–	–	o	4.00	q
1	A	Irie Hill	England	–	–	o	–	o	o	4.00	q
1	A	Bridgid Isworth	Australia	–	–	–	–	–	o	4.00	q
1	B	Dana Ellis	Canada	–	–	–	–	o	o	4.00	q
1	B	Stephanie McCann	Canada	–	–	–	–	–	o	4.00	q
6	B	Kym Howe	Australia	–	–	–	–	xo	o	4.00	q
7	A	Zoë Brown	Northern Ireland	o	–	o	o	xo	xo	4.00	q, NR
8	B	Melina Hamilton	New Zealand	–	–	–	o	xxo	xo	4.00	q
9	A	Rhian Clarke	Wales	–	–	o	–	o	xx–	3.90	q
9	A	Lucy Webber	England	–	o	–	o	o	xx–	3.90	q
11	B	Anna Fitidou	Cyprus	–	o	o	xxo	o	xx–	3.90	q
12	B	Tracey Bloomfield	England	o	–	o	xo	xo	xx–	3.90	q
13	B	Sonia Lawrence	Wales	o	–	xxo	o	xxo	xxx	3.90	PB
14	A	Ardin Tucker	Canada	–	–	–	xo	–	xxx	3.80	
15	B	Gillian Cooke	Scotland	–	xo	–	xxx			3.60	

=== Final ===
Rank	Athlete	Nationality	3.60	3.80	3.90	4.00	4.10	4.15	4.20	4.25	4.30	4.35	Result	Notes
1st place, gold medalist(s)	Tatiana Grigorieva	Australia	–	–	–	–	–	xo	–	o	–	xxo	4.35	GR
2nd place, silver medalist(s)	Kym Howe	Australia	–	–	–	o	–	o	–	x–	xx		4.15	
3rd place, bronze medalist(s)	Irie Hill	England	–	o	–	o	o	–	xxx				4.10	
3rd place, bronze medalist(s)	Bridgid Isworth	Australia	–	–	–	o	o	–	xxx				4.10	
3rd place, bronze medalist(s)	Stephanie McCann	Canada	–	–	–	o	o	xxx					4.10	
6	Dana Ellis	Canada	–	–	–	xxo	xxx						4.00	
7	Zoë Brown	Northern Ireland	o	xo	o	xxx							3.90	
8	Lucy Webber	England	xxo	o	o	xxx							3.90	
9	Melina Hamilton	New Zealand	–	–	xo	xxx							3.90	
10	Tracey Bloomfield	England	o	o	xxo	xxx							3.90	
11	Anna Fitidou	Cyprus	o	o	xxx								3.80	
12	Rhian Clarke	Wales	–	o	–	xxx							3.80	
