= 2005 Asian Athletics Championships – Women's pole vault =

The women's pole vault event at the 2005 Asian Athletics Championships was held in Incheon, South Korea on September 2.

== Results ==
Rank	Name	Nationality	Result	Notes
1st place, gold medalist(s)	Gao Shuying	China	4.53	CR, AR
2nd place, silver medalist(s)	Chang Ko-Hsin	Chinese Taipei	4.10	NR
3rd place, bronze medalist(s)	Roslinda Samsu	Malaysia	4.10	
4	Choi Yun-hee	South Korea	4.05	NR
5	Ikuko Nishikori	Japan	4.00	
5	Le Thi Phuong	Vietnam	4.00	
7	Zhao Yingying	China	4.00	
8	Takayo Kondo	Japan	4.00	
9	V. S. Surekha	India	3.80	NR
10	Chetna Solanki	India	3.70	
11	Hsu Hsueh-Chin	Chinese Taipei	3.60	
