= Athletics at the 2006 Asian Games – Women's pole vault =

Women's pole vault at the 2006 Asian Games
- Venue: Khalifa International Stadium
- Date: 12 December 2006
- Competitors: 7 from 6 nations

Medalists
gold medal	Gao Shuying	China
silver medal	Roslinda Samsu	Malaysia
bronze medal	Ikuko Nishikori	Japan
bronze medal	Zhao Yingying	China

The women's pole vault competition at the 2006 Asian Games in Doha, Qatar was held on 12 December 2006 at the Khalifa International Stadium.

== Schedule ==
All times are Arabia Standard Time (UTC+03:00)

Date	Time	Event
Tuesday, 12 December 2006	16:00	Final

== Records ==
Prior to this competition, the existing world, Asian and Games records were as follows.

World Record	Yelena Isinbayeva (RUS)	5.01	Helsinki, Finland	12 August 2005
Asian Record	Gao Shuying (CHN)	4.53	Incheon, South Korea	2 September 2005
Games Record	Gao Shuying (CHN)	4.35	Busan, South Korea	9 October 2002

== Results ==
Rank	Athlete	Attempt					Result	Notes
Rank	Athlete	3.80	4.00	4.15	4.30	4.40	Result	Notes
1st place, gold medalist(s)	Gao Shuying (CHN)	–	–	O	O	XXX	4.30	
2nd place, silver medalist(s)	Roslinda Samsu (MAS)	–	XXO	O	XXO	XXX	4.30	
3rd place, bronze medalist(s)	Ikuko Nishikori (JPN)	–	XXO	O	XXX		4.15	
3rd place, bronze medalist(s)	Zhao Yingying (CHN)	–	XXO	O	XXX		4.15	
5	Choi Yun-hee (KOR)	XO	XXO	XXX			4.00	
6	V. S. Surekha (IND)	O	XXX				3.80	
7	Lê Thị Phương (VIE)	XO	XXX				3.80	
