= Masters W35 pole vault world record progression =

This is the progression of world record improvements of the pole vault W35 division of Masters athletics.

Key

Incomplete information Pending Indoor mark before 2000, not acceptable for record

Height	Athlete	Nationality	Birthdate	Age	Location	Date	Ref
4.83 m	Jennifer Suhr	United States	4 February 1982	35 years, 70 days	Austin	15 April 2017	
4.70 m	Stacy Dragila	United States	25 March 1971	37 years, 89 days	Chula Vista	22 June 2008	
4.25 m i	Gabriela Mihalcea	Romania	27 January 1964	35 years, 17 days	Pireas	13 February 1999	
3.90 m	Cassandra Kelly	New Zealand	29 June 1963	35 years, 82 days	Kuala Lumpur	19 September 1998	
3.53 m	Sue Di Marco	United States	29 March 1963	35 years, 104 days	Fullerton	11 July 1998	
