= Lê Thị Phương =

Vietnamese pole vaulter

Personal information
- Nationality: Vietnam
- Born: 12 November 1983 (age 43)

Sport
- Sport: Athletics
- Event: Pole Vault

Lê Thị Phương (born 12 November 1983 in Hoằng Hóa, Thanh Hóa) is a retired Vietnamese pole vaulter.

On the continental scene she finished sixth at the 2003 Asian Championships, fifth at the 2005 Asian Championships and seventh at the 2006 Asian Games.

Her personal best jump is 4.20 metres, achieved at the 2011 Southeast Asian Games.
