= Dave Nielsen =

American track and field coach

Dave Nielsen is the former head track and field coach of the men's and women's teams at Idaho State University. Nielsen is known for his pioneering work in the pole vault. As of 2012, Nielsen was entering his 25th year as Head Track and Field Coach. Along with coaching the Bengal track and field athletes and Dragila, Nielsen coached Paul Litchfield and heptathlete Jackie Poulson. He also coached Stacy Dragila, who won a gold medal in the pole vault in the 2000 Summer Olympics. As of 2017, Nielsen has accepted a position at Eastern Washington University as the jumps and multi events coach.

== Publications ==
Neilsen has produced four DVDs: Pole Vault Fundamentals and Techniques, Effective Practice Drills for the Pole Vault, Gymnastics Training for the Pole Vault, and Women’s Pole Vault featuring Stacy Dragila.

He has published many articles on various aspects of the vault, including "Athletics Outstanding Performer – The Vaulting Pole" and "Jump Efficiently".

By the numbers	By the years
1 - Olympic Gold Medalist (Stacy Dragila, 2000)	2007 Mountain Region Women's Outdoor Coach of the Year
1 - NCAA Champion (Amber Welty, 1988)	2006 Big Sky Indoor Co-Coach of the Year
11 - Academic All-Americans	2005 Big Sky Indoor Coach of the Year
17 - Big Sky Scholar Athletes	2003 Coached team USA Heptathletes in the Netherlands
20 - All-Americans	2000 USA Track and Field Nike Elite Coach of the Year.
49 - NCAA Qualifiers	2000 Finalist USOC National Coach of the Year
140 - Big Sky Champions	2000 District/Mountain Region Coach of the Year
351 - All-Big Sky Athletes	1998 Big Sky Coach of the Year
916 - Academic All-Big Sky Honorees	1997 Big Sky Coach of the Year
