= 1998 World Junior Championships in Athletics – Women's pole vault =

The women's pole vault event at the 1998 World Junior Championships in Athletics was held in Annecy, France, at Parc des Sports on 28 and 29 July.

== Medalists ==
Gold	Monika Götz; Germany
Silver	María Mar Sánchez; Spain
Silver	Monika Pyrek; Poland

== Results ==
=== Final ===
29 July

Rank	Name	Nationality	Result	Notes
1st place, gold medalist(s)	Monika Götz	Germany	4.20	
2nd place, silver medalist(s)	María Mar Sánchez	Spain	4.10	
2nd place, silver medalist(s)	Monika Pyrek	Poland	4.10	
4	Yvonne Buschbaum	Germany	4.10	
5	Amandine Homo	France	4.05	
6	Vanessa Boslak	France	4.00	
7	Anna Wielgus	Poland	4.00	
8	Gao Shuying	China	3.90	
9	Yelena Isinbaeva	Russia	3.90	
10	Tuna Köstem	Turkey	3.90	
11	Kym Howe	Australia	3.90	
12	Christine Elwin	Australia	3.70	

=== Qualifications ===
28 Jul

==== Group A ====
Rank	Name	Nationality	Result	Notes
1	Monika Pyrek	Poland	4.00	Q
2	Amandine Homo	France	3.90	q
3	Gao Shuying	China	3.90	q
3	Yvonne Buschbaum	Germany	3.90	q
5	Christine Elwin	Australia	3.80	q
6	Monika Erlach	Austria	3.65	
7	Alla Checheleva	Russia	3.65	
8	Iris Niederer	Switzerland	3.65	
9	Tracey Bloomfield	United Kingdom	3.50	
9	Nina Zega	Slovenia	3.50	
9	Teja Melink	Slovenia	3.50	
12	Ana Vieira	Portugal	3.50	
13	Ioánna Volpánou	Greece	3.50	
14	Annu Mäkelä	Finland	3.50	
15	Kuan Mei-Lien	Chinese Taipei	3.30	

==== Group B ====
Rank	Name	Nationality	Result	Notes
1	Monika Götz	Germany	3.90	q
2	Tuna Köstem	Turkey	3.90	q
3	Anna Wielgus	Poland	3.90	q
4	Yelena Isinbaeva	Russia	3.90	q
5	Vanessa Boslak	France	3.80	q
6	María Mar Sánchez	Spain	3.80	q
7	Kym Howe	Australia	3.80	q
8	Fanni Juhász	Hungary	3.80	
9	Emma Draisey	New Zealand	3.65	
10	Mami Nakano	Japan	3.65	
11	Elisabete Tavares	Portugal	3.65	
12	Fabiana Murer	Brazil	3.65	
13	Melissa Feinstein	United States	3.50	
14	Du Na	China	3.50	
14	Katalin Donáth	Hungary	3.50	
16	Chang Ko-Hsin	Chinese Taipei	3.50	

== Participation ==
According to an unofficial count, 31 athletes from 21 countries participated in the event.

- Australia (2)
- Austria (1)
- Brazil (1)
- China (2)
- Chinese Taipei (2)
- Finland (1)
- France (2)
- Germany (2)
- Greece (1)
- Hungary (2)
- Japan (1)
- New Zealand (1)
- Poland (2)
- Portugal (2)
- Russia (2)
- Slovenia (2)
- Spain (1)
- Switzerland (1)
- Turkey (1)
- United Kingdom (1)
- United States (1)
