= Athletics at the 2006 Commonwealth Games – Women's pole vault =

Women's pole vault at the Commonwealth Games

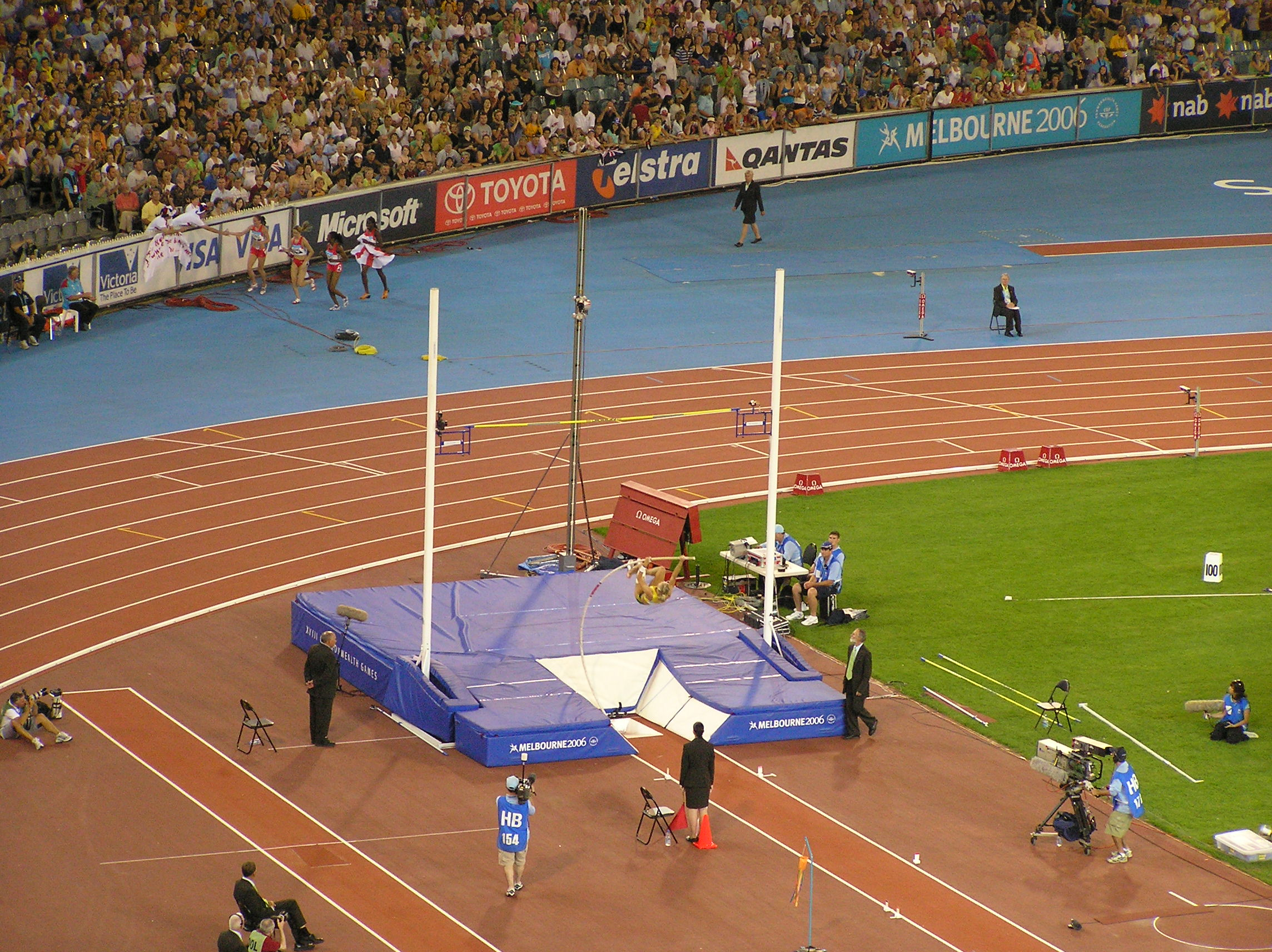
The women's pole vault in progress at the Games

The women's pole vault event at the 2006 Commonwealth Games was held on March 23–25.

== Medalists ==
Gold	Silver	Bronze
Kym Howe; Australia	Tatiana Grigorieva; Australia	Stephanie McCann; Canada

== Results ==
=== Qualification ===
Qualification: 4.30 m (Q) or at least 12 best (q) qualified for the final.

Rank	Group	Athlete	Nationality	3.40	3.60	3.80	3.90	4.00	4.10	4.20	Result	Notes
1	A	Kym Howe	Australia	–	–	–	–	–	–	o	4.20	q
2	A	Vicky Parnov	Australia	–	–	–	–	xo	o	–	4.10	q
3	A	Tatiana Grigorieva	Australia	–	–	–	–	–	xo	–	4.10	q
4	A	Kate Dennison	England	–	–	o	–	o	–	–	4.00	q
4	A	Stephanie McCann	Canada	–	–	–	–	o	–	–	4.00	q
4	B	Zoë Brown	Northern Ireland	–	–	o	–	o	–	–	4.00	q
4	B	Dana Ellis	Canada	–	–	–	–	o	–	–	4.00	q
4	B	Melina Hamilton	New Zealand	–	–	o	–	o	–	–	4.00	q
9	B	Roslinda Samsu	Malaysia	–	–	xo	o	o	–	x	4.00	q
10	B	Anna Fitidou	Cyprus	–	–	–	o	xo	–	–	4.00	q
11	B	Kelsie Hendry	Canada	–	–	–	–	xo	–	–	4.00	q
12	A	Elizabeth Spain	England	–	–	xo	o	xxx			3.90	q
13	B	Kirsty Maguire	Scotland	–	xo	o	xxx				3.80	
14	B	Samantha Dodd	South Africa	–	–	xo	–	xxx			3.80	
15	A	Nancy Cheekoussen	Mauritius	o	xxx						3.40	

=== Final ===
Rank	Athlete	Nationality	4.00	4.15	4.25	4.35	4.40	4.45	4.50	4.55	4.62	4.70	Result	Notes
1st place, gold medalist(s)	Kym Howe	Australia	–	–	–	o	–	o	o	–	xo	x–	4.62	GR
2nd place, silver medalist(s)	Tatiana Grigorieva	Australia	–	o	o	xo	–	x–	x–	x			4.35	
3rd place, bronze medalist(s)	Stephanie McCann	Canada	–	o	xo	xxx							4.25	
4	Dana Ellis	Canada	–	o	xxo	xxx							4.25	
4	Roslinda Samsu	Malaysia	o	o	xxo	xxx							4.25	PB
6	Vicky Parnov	Australia	o	xo	xxo	xxx							4.25	
7	Kate Dennison	England	o	o	xxx								4.15	
8	Melina Hamilton	New Zealand	o	xo	xxx								4.15	
8	Kelsie Hendry	Canada	o	xo	xxx								4.15	
10	Anna Fitidou	Cyprus	xo	xxo	xxx								4.15	
11	Elizabeth Spain	England	xo	xxx									4.00	
12	Zoë Brown	Northern Ireland	xxo	xxx									4.00	
