= Athletics at the 2001 Summer Universiade – Women's pole vault =

The women's pole vault event at the 2001 Summer Universiade was held at the Workers Stadium in Beijing, China on 29 August.

== Results ==
Rank	Athlete	Nationality	Result	Notes
1st place, gold medalist(s)	Gao Shuying	China	4.52	GR
2nd place, silver medalist(s)	Sabine Schulte	Germany	4.35	
3rd place, bronze medalist(s)	Šárka Mládková	Czech Republic	4.20	
4	Dana Cervantes	Spain	4.10	
5	Stephanie McCann	Canada	4.10	
6	Rachael Dacy	Australia	4.10	
6	Zhang Na	China	4.10	
8	Becky Holliday	United States	4.00	
9	Rhian Clarke	Great Britain	4.00	
10	Fanni Juhász	Hungary	4.00	
11	Rosanna Ditton	Australia	3.90	
12	Dana Ellis	Canada	3.90	
13	Nadine Rohr	Switzerland	3.80	
13	Anastasia Ivanova	Russia	3.80	
15	Chang Ko-Hsin	Chinese Taipei	3.80	
16	Caroline Goetghebuer	Belgium	3.50	
	Zsuzsanna Szabó	Hungary	NM	
	María Paz Ausin	Chile	NM	
	Tracy O'Hara	United States	NM	
