= Athletics at the 1998 Commonwealth Games – Women's pole vault =

Women's pole vault at the Commonwealth Games

The women's pole vault event at the 1998 Commonwealth Games was held on 19 September in Kuala Lumpur.

This was the first time that this event was contested at the Commonwealth Games.

== Results ==
Rank	Name	Nationality	Result	Notes
1st place, gold medalist(s)	Emma George	Australia	4.20	GR
2nd place, silver medalist(s)	Elmarie Gerryts	South Africa	4.15	
3rd place, bronze medalist(s)	Trista Bernier	Canada	4.15	PB
4	Janine Whitlock	England	4.00	
5	Rachael Dacy	Australia	4.00	
6	Jenny Dryburgh	New Zealand	3.90	
7	Melina Hamilton	New Zealand	3.90	
7	Cassandra Kelly	New Zealand	3.90	
7	Tracey Shepherd	Australia	3.90	
10	Anna Fitidou	Cyprus	3.80	
11	Rhian Clarke	Wales	3.80	
12	Paula Wilson	England	3.70	
13	Rebecca Chambers	Canada	3.60	
14	Alison Murray-Jessee	Scotland	3.50	
15	Emma Hornby	England	3.50	
