= Anita Tomulevski =

Norwegian gymnast and athletics competitor

Anita Tomulevski, married Bjerregård (born 15 March 1977) is a retired Norwegian gymnast and pole vaulter.

She represented the club Oslo TF. At the age of 15 she competed in individual all-around gymnastics at the 1992 Summer Olympics. She finished 79th in the qualifying round. She was the last Norwegian gymnast to qualify for an Olympics until Julie Erichsen for Tokyo 2020.

After switching to the pole vault she finished eighth at the 1996 European Indoor Championships and competed at the 1997 World Indoor Championships without reaching the final. Representing SK Vidar, she became the first Norwegian women's pole vault champion in 1996 and won back-to-back in 1997.

She set the second official Norwegian record with 3.40 metres at Bislett stadion on 5 June 1996. On 11 June in Gjøvik she vaulted 3.80 metres to improve the record. The record stood until June 2006. Her personal best jump remained 3.80 metres.
