= 2003 Asian Athletics Championships – Women's pole vault =

The women's pole vault event at the 2003 Asian Athletics Championships was held in Manila, Philippines on September 21.

== Results ==
Rank	Name	Nationality	Result	Notes
1st place, gold medalist(s)	Wu Sha	China	4.20	=CR
2nd place, silver medalist(s)	Takayo Kondo	Japan	4.10	=SB
3rd place, bronze medalist(s)	Ni Putu Desy Margawati	Indonesia	3.90	
4	Gao Shuying	China	3.80	
5	Masumi Ono	Japan	3.80	
6	Chang Ko-Hsin	Chinese Taipei	3.60	
6	Le Thi Phuong	Vietnam	3.60	
8	Chen Hsiang-Chen	Chinese Taipei	3.60	
