= Ikuko Nishikori =

Japanese pole vaulter (born 1980)

Personal information
- Nationality: Japan
- Born: 5 January 1980 (age 46) Izumo, Shimane, Japan
- Education: Waseda University
- Height: 1.65 m (5 ft 5 in)
- Weight: 54 kg (119 lb)

Sport
- Sport: Track and field
- Event: Pole vault

Achievements and titles
- Personal best: 4.36 m (Hiroshima 2006)
Medal record
Women's athletics
Representing Japan
Asian Games
Bronze medal – third place	2006 Doha	Pole vault
Asian Indoor Championships
Gold medal – first place	2006 Pattaya	Pole vault
Gold medal – first place	2008 Doha	Pole vault
East Asian Games
Bronze medal – third place	2005 Macau	Pole vault

Ikuko Nishikori (錦織 育子, Nishikori Ikuko; born 5 January 1980 in Izumo, Shimane) is a retired Japanese pole vaulter.

She won the bronze medal at the 2005 East Asian Games, finished fifth at the 2005 Asian Championships, won the gold medal at the 2006 Asian Indoor Championships, the bronze medal at the 2006 Asian Games and the gold medal at the 2008 Asian Indoor Championships.

Her personal best jump is 4.36 metres, achieved in April 2006 in Hiroshima. Indoors she has 4.31 metres, achieved in February 2006 in Yokohama. These are both former national records.

== International competition ==
Year	Competition	Venue	Position	Event	Height	Notes
Representing Japan
2005	Asian Championships	Incheon, South Korea	8th	Pole vault	4.00	
2005	East Asian Games	Macau, China	3rd	Pole vault	4.30	
2006	Asian Indoor Championships	Pattaya, Thailand	1st	Pole vault	4.20	=GR
2006	Asian Games	Doha, Qatar	3rd	Pole vault	4.15	
2008	Asian Indoor Championships	Doha, Qatar	1st	Pole vault	4.10	
