= Athletics at the 1998 Asian Games – Women's pole vault =

Women's pole vault at the 1998 Asian Games
- Venue: Thammasat Stadium
- Dates: 19 December 1998
- Competitors: 6 from 3 nations

Medalists
gold medal	Cai Weiyan	China
silver medal	Masumi Ono	Japan
bronze medal	Sun Caiyun	China

The women's pole vault competition at the 1998 Asian Games in Bangkok, Thailand was held on 19 December at the Thammasat Stadium. This was the first time that this event was contested at the Asian Games.

== Schedule ==
All times are Indochina Time (UTC+07:00)

Date	Time	Event
Saturday, 19 December 1998	13:30	Final

== Results ==
Rank	Athlete	Result	Notes
1st place, gold medalist(s)	Cai Weiyan (CHN)	4.00	GR
2nd place, silver medalist(s)	Masumi Ono (JPN)	4.00	=GR
3rd place, bronze medalist(s)	Sun Caiyun (CHN)	4.00	=GR
4	Takayo Kondo (JPN)	3.90	
5	Chang Ko-hsin (TPE)	3.70	
6	Kuan Mei-lien (TPE)	3.50	
