= Melissa Mueller =

American pole vaulter

Personal information
- Born: November 16, 1972 (age 53) Waukesha, Wisconsin, U.S.
Medal record
Women's Athletics
Representing the United States
Pan American Games
Gold medal – first place	2003 Santo Domingo	Pole Vault

Melissa Mueller (born November 16, 1972, in Waukesha, Wisconsin) is an American pole vaulter.

She finished fifth at the 1999 World Indoor Championships and won the gold medal at the 2003 Pan American Games in Santo Domingo. She also competed at the 2000 Summer Olympics.

Her personal best jump is 4.60 metres, achieved in July 2003 at an All-comers track meet in Atascadero, California. She now lives in Georgia.
