= 1994 German Athletics Championships =

- Edition: 94th
- Start date: 1 July
- End date: 3 July
- Host city: Erfurt, Germany
- Venue: Steigerwaldstadion
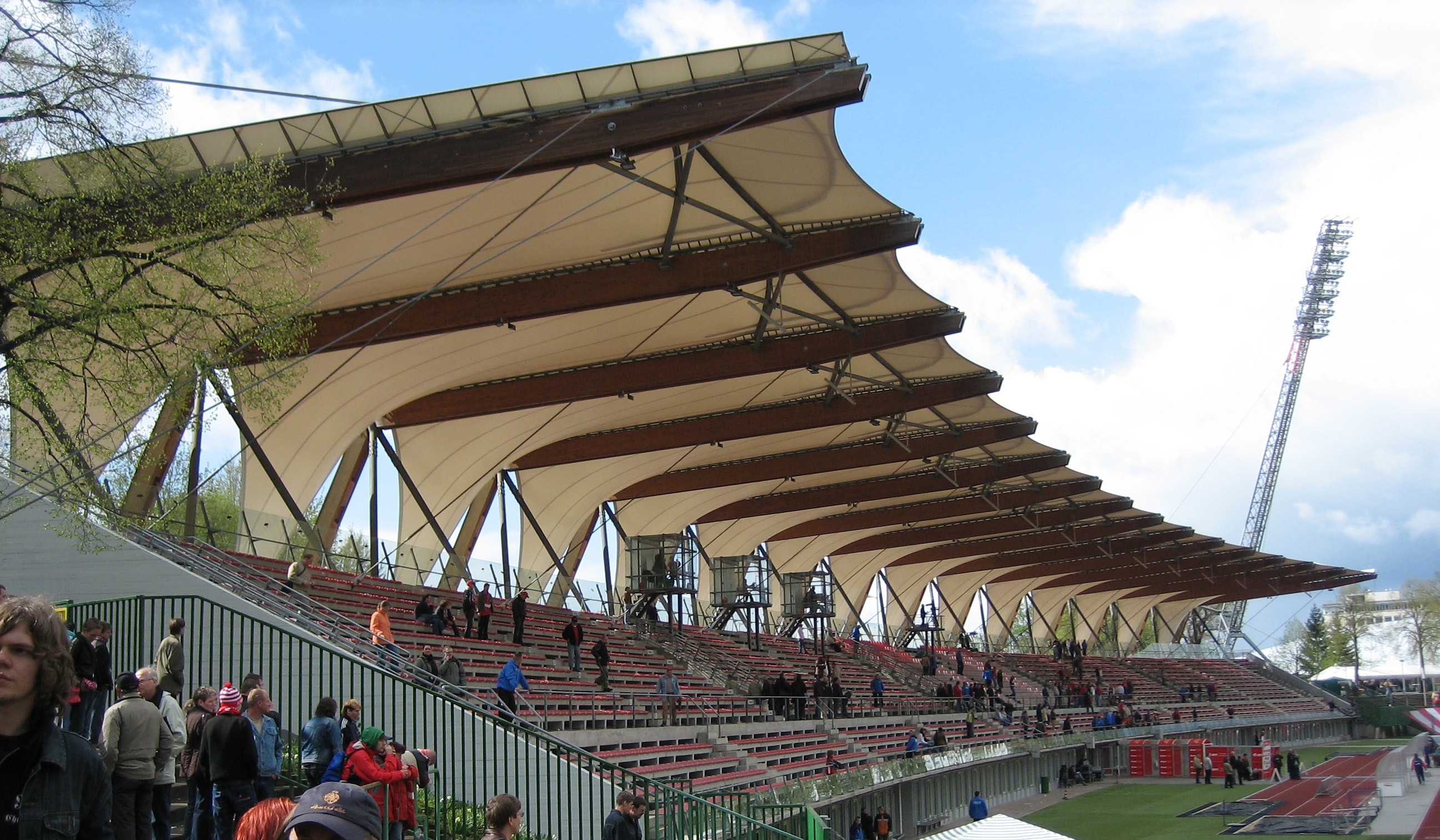
- Events: 38 (+42)

The 1994 German Athletics Championships was the 94th edition of the national championship in outdoor track and field for Germany. It was held on 1–3 July at the Steigerwaldstadion in Erfurt. It served as the selection meeting for Germany at the 1994 European Athletics Championships.

In the women's triple jump, Helga Radtke achieved a new German record with a mark of 14.46 m – a record which went unbeaten until 13 June 2011. The men's half marathon was won by Salvatore Di Dio in 1:04:06, but he was not elected senior national champion as he had only registered for the junior race.

== Championships ==
As usual, due to time or organizational reasons, various competitions were not held as part of the main event in Erfurt. The annual national championships in Germany held separately from the main track and field competition comprised the following:

Event	Venue	Date(s)	Notes
Cross country running	Burghaslach	5 March	
Half marathon	Melle	10 April	
Marathon	Frankfurt	23 October	incorporated into the Frankfurt Marathon
10,000 metres	Kappelrodeck	14 May	
Relays; Women's 3 × 800 m Men's 4 × 800 m Men's 4 × 1500 m	Ulm	31 July	incorporated into the German Youth Athletics Championships
Combined track and field events Women's heptathlon Men's decathlon	Vaterstetten	2–3 September	
100K run	Neuwittenbek	24 September	
Mountain running	Freiburg im Breisgau	6 August	Held in conjunction with the Schauinsland Berglauf
Racewalking; Men's 50 km walk Women's 10 km walk	Offenburg	1 May	

== Results ==
=== Men ===
Event	Gold		Silver		Bronze	
100 metres	Marc Blume; TV Wattenscheid	10.28 s	Michael Huke; TV Wattenscheid	10.43 s	Jörg Rößler; LAC Quelle Fürth / München	10.53 s
200 metres	Michael Huke; TV Wattenscheid	20.60 s	Alexander Lack; SC Neubrandenburg	20.70 s	Björn Sinnhuber; MTG Mannheim	20.78 s
400 metres	Kai Karsten; LG Braunschweig	46.10 s	Lutz Becker; USC Mainz	46.24 s	Daniel Bittner; LG Bayer Leverkusen	46.29 s
800 metres	Nico Motchebon; LAC Halensee Berlin	1:46.64 min	Joachim Dehmel; SpVgg. Feuerbach	1:46.77 min	Imram Sillah; LG Düsseldorf	1:47.45 min
1500 metres	Rüdiger Stenzel; TV Wattenscheid	3:49.91 min	Christoph Meyer; Hamburger SV	3:50.51 min	Torsten Kallweit; TV Wattenscheid	3:51.01 min
5000 metres	Dieter Baumann; LG Bayer Leverkusen	13:46.67 min	Stéphane Franke; Salamander Kornwestheim	13:47.41 min	Mirko Döring; ASV Köln	14:08.57 min
10,000 metres	Dieter Baumann; LG Bayer Leverkusen	28:20.66 min	Carsten Arndt; SSC Hanau-Rodenbach	29:30.86 min	Markus Pingpank; LG Braunschweig	29:31.14 min
Half marathon	Klaus-Peter Nabein; LAC Quelle Fürth / München	1:04:11	Konrad Dobler; SVO Germaringen	1:04:19	Dirk Nürnberger; LAC Quelle Fürth / München	1:04:55
Half marathon team	LAC Quelle Fürth / München; Klaus-Peter Nabein; Dirk Nürnberger; Engelbert Franz	3:14:55	LG Braunschweig; Rainer Huth; Christian Husmann; Markus Pingpank	3:18:19	SVO Germaringen; Konrad Dobler; Philipp Kehl; Martin Sambale	3:20:30
Marathon	Stephan Freigang; LC Cottbus	2:16:35	Klaus-Peter Nabein; LAC Quelle Fürth / München	2:18:48	Uwe Honsdorf; Rot-Weiß Koblenz	2:18:51
Marathon team	LC Cottbus; Stephan Freigang; Uwe Czarnofski; Dirk Schinkoreit	6:58:23	LAC Quelle Fürth / München; Klaus-Peter Nabein; Dirk Nürnberger; Eike Loch	7:03:08	TV Geiselhöring 1862; Michael Braun; Werner Hetzerecker; Peter Kiefl	7:19:21
100 kilometres	Kazimierz Bak; MTP Hersbruck	6:42:48	Michael Sommer; Eichenkreuz Schwaikheim	6:48:30	Lutz Aderhold; Spiridon Frankfurt	6:50:50
100 kilometres team	LTF Marpingen I Guido Joerg; Volker Becker-Wirbel; Robert Feller	21:38:33	SV Germania Helmstedt; Volker Krajenski; Helmut Dreyer; Hans-Günter Wolff	22:28:25	LTF Marpingen II; Jörg Hooß; Franz Feller; Stefan Feller	23:47:43
110 m hurdles	Florian Schwarthoff; TV Heppenheim	13.34 s	Mike Fenner; SCC Berlin	13.49 s	Claude Edorh; ASV Köln	13.50 s
400 m hurdles	Edgar Itt; TV Gelnhausen	48.48 s	Michael Kaul; USC Mainz	49.55 s	Helge Bormann; TSG Bergedorf	49.63 s
3000 m s'chase	Martin Strege; TSV Erfurt	8:30.30 min	Kim Bauermeister; LG Filderstadt	8:32.83 min	Steffen Brand; LG Bayer Leverkusen	8:35.29 min
4 × 100 m relay	TV Heppenheim; Christian Thomas; Florian Schwarthoff; Alexander Bub; Thorsten Dauth	39.89 s	LAC Quelle Fürth / München; Jörg Treffer; Jörg Rößler; Jürgen Urban; Peter Neumaier	40.14 s	VfL Sindelfingen; Holger Vogelsang; Robert Schulz; Michael Schwab; Oliver Schmidt	40.20 s
4 × 400 m relay	LG Bayer Leverkusen; Andreas Heuel; Julian Völkel; Markus Rau; Daniel Bittner	3:06.45 min	LAC Chemnitz; Jens Carlowitz; Uwe Jahn; Freund; Rico Lieder	3:07.71 min	ASV Köln; Sascha von Weschpfennig; Mario Schmitz; Klaus Christian Weigeldt; Thomas Kälicke	3:07.71 min
4 × 800 m relay	LG Bayer Leverkusen; Burkhard Wagner; Oliver Klaudt; Stephan Plätzer; Alexander Adam	7:20.20 min	MTV Ingolstadt; Hans Stamm; Alfred Hummel; Dieter Gabriel; Peter Braun	7:21.88 min	USC Mainz; Rulhof; Berthes; Hebecker; Probst	7:27.40 min
4 × 1500 m relay	Hamburger SV; Andreas Fischer; Marco Rohrer; Jörn Klaus Wagner; Christoph Meyer	15:17.06 min	TV Wattenscheid; Daniel Elferich; Carsten Otte; Mark Ostendarp; Thorsten Kallweit	15:17.70 min	SpVgg. Feuerbach; Alexander Dehmel; Heiko Striegel; Holger Mürle; Joachim Dehmel	15:36.98 min
20 km walk	Axel Noack; Berliner TSC	1:22:25	Robert Ihly; LG Offenburg	1:24:11	Ronald Weigel; LAC Halensee Berlin	1:26:47
20 km walk team	SC DHfK Leipzig; Markus Pauly; Michael Lohse; Lars Rolf	4:31:46	TSV Erfurt; Thomas Wallstab; Thomas Prophet; Johannes Schmidt	4:35:58	LAC Quelle Fürth / München; Peter Zanner; Ralf Rose; Alfons Schwarz	4:38:10
50 km walk	Ronald Weigel; LAC Halensee Berlin	3:52:56	Robert Ihly; LG Offenburg	3:58:10	Thomas Wallstab; TSV Erfurt	3:58:40
50 km walk team	LAC Quelle Fürth / München; Peter Zanner; Alfons Schwarz; Hardy Koschollek	12:52:38	Berliner SV 1892 I Manuel Kollorz; Karl Degener; Andreas Klose	13:54:08	Berliner SV 1892 II; Reiner Mundkowski; Kiepers; Trudjumow	15:02:47
High jump	Wolf-Hendrik Beyer; LG Bayer Leverkusen	2.30 m	Wolfgang Kreißig; MTG Mannheim	2.28 m	Ralf Sonn; TSG Weinheim	2.28 m
Pole vault	Tim Lobinger; LG Bayer Leverkusen	5.55 m	Werner Holl; LG Stuttgart	5.50 m	Mark Lugenbühl; ASV Landau	5.40 m
Long jump	Dietmar Haaf; LG Salamander Kornwestheim	8.24 m	Georg Ackermann; TV Heppenheim	8.12 m	André Müller; SC Empor Rostock	8.02 m
Triple jump	Volker Mai; SC Neubrandenburg	16.50 m	André Ernst; SV Halle	16.46 m	Wolfgang Knabe; TV Wattenscheid	16.44 m
Shot put	Oliver-Sven Buder; TV Wattenscheid	20.44 m	Thorsten Herbrand; LG Bayer Leverkusen	19.19 m	Oliver Dück; LAC Quelle Fürth / München	18.77 m
Discus throw	Lars Riedel; LAC Chemnitz	65.50 m	Jürgen Schult; Schweriner SC	64.14 m	Andreas Seelig; USC Mainz	60.70 m
Hammer throw	Heinz Weis; LG Bayer Leverkusen	79.68 m	Claus Dethlof; LG Bayer Leverkusen	74.36 m	Karsten Kobs; LG Olympia Dortmund	74.00 m
Javelin throw	Raymond Hecht; TV Wattenscheid	85.88 m	Peter Blank; USC Mainz	82.56 m	Boris Henry; TV Ludweiler	79.50 m
Decathlon	Norbert Demmel; LAC Quelle Fürth/München	7919 pts	Michael Kohnle; SG Ulm	7756 pts	Frank Müller; LAV Norden	7734 pts
Decathlon team	LAV Norden; Frank Müller; Gerd Zander; Robert Kleemann	21.570 pts	LG Bayer Leverkusen; Helge Günther; Bernd Knut; Axel Schnütgen	21.417 pts	LAC Quelle Fürth / München; Norbert Demmel; Peter Neumaier; Henrich Schmidt	21.085 pts
Cross country short course – 3.8 km	Uwe König; SCC Berlin	11:59 min	Albrecht Bauer; TSV Wendlingen	12:03 min	Olaf Beyer; SCC Berlin	12:04 min
Cross country short course, Team	SCC Berlin; Uwe König; Olaf Beyer; Jens Joppich	22	LG Braunschweig; Thilo Krebs; Krause; Frank Mäusner	70	ASC Darmstadt; Jörg Balle; Michael Heist; Jan Neiser	76
Cross country long course – 10.8 km	Stephan Freigang; LC Cottbus	35:32 min	Steffen Dittmann; TuS Solbad Ravensberg	35:44 min	Martin Bremer; LG Bayer Leverkusen	35:54 min
Cross country long course, Team	LG Bayer Leverkusen; Martin Bremer; Heinz-Bernd Bürger; Ralf Dahmen	47	SVO Germaringen; Konrad Dobler; Martin Sambale; Philipp Kehl	68	LAC Quelle Fürth / München; Eike Loch; Hans Forster; Klaus-Peter Nabein	77
Mountain running	Michael Scheytt; VfL Sindelfingen	34:32 min	Jörg Leipner; LG Frankfurt	34:44 min	Stefan Wohllebe; TV Wiesbaden-Waldstraße	34:45 min
Mountain running	LC Breisgau; Dirk Debertin; Charly Doll; Peter Fröhlich	1:47:08 h	LG Frankfurt; Jörg Leipner; Wolfgang Münzel; Jan-Henning Schoch	1:48:54	LG Regensburg; Helmut Strobl; Manfred Dusold; Josef Oefele	1:49:28

=== Women ===
Event	Gold		Silver		Bronze	
100 metres	Melanie Paschke; LG Braunschweig	11.20 s	Bettina Zipp; TV Schriesheim	11.45 s	Andrea Philipp; Schweriner SC	11.58 s
200 metres	Melanie Paschke; LG Braunschweig	22.45 s	Silke-Beate Knoll; LG Olympia Dortmund	22.55 s	Silke Lichtenhagen; LG Bayer Leverkusen	22.73 s
400 metres	Anja Rücker; TuS Jena	52.05 s	Karin Janke; VfL Wolfsburg	52.33 s	Jana Schönenberger; OSC Berlin	52.42 s
800 metres	Christine Wachtel; SC Neubrandenburg	2:02.70 min	Katie Kovacs; SCC Berlin	2:02.89 min	Simone Weidner; OSC Berlin	2:03.71 min
1500 metres	Ellen Kiessling; ASV Köln	4:15.26 min	Antje Beggerow; SC Empor Rostock	4:16.02 min	Carmen Wüstenhagen; SCC Berlin	4:18.08 min
3000 metres	Andrea Karhoff; ASV Köln	9:10.42 min	Claudia Lokar; LG Olympia Dortmund	9:11.73 min	Claudia Metzner; LG Sauerland	9:13.11 min
10,000 metres	Kathrin Weßel; OSC Berlin	32:44.11 min	Katrin Dörre-Heinig; LAC Quelle Fürth / München	33:16.39 min	Claudia Dreher; LG Olympia Dortmund	33:43.85 min
Half marathon	Monika Schäfer; LAC Quelle Fürth / München	1:14:00	Doris Grossert; LG Braunschweig	1:14:39	Romy Lindner; SV Blau-Weiß Auerbach	1:15:25
Half marathon team	LAC Quelle Fürth / München; Monika Schäfer; Andrea Fleischer; Johanna Baumgartner	3:48:07	LG Braunschweig; Doris Grossert; Martina Lehmann; Katrin Bröger	3:57:02	ASC Darmstadt; Ursula Wolf; Corinna Rusch; E. Heinrich	3:58:54
Marathon	Kathrin Weßel; OSC Berlin	2:36:29	Romy Lindner; SV Blau-Weiß Auerbach	2:38:48	Manuela Veith; ABC Ludwigshafen	2:41:24
Marathon team	LC Breisgau; Sonja Ambrosy; Karin Steiger; Monika Imgraben	8:44:14	LG Bremen Nord; Petra Liebertz; Rebecka Weise-Jung; Christine Fuchs	8:50:03	LG Regensburg; Katharina Kaufmann; Gabriele Wendl; Anita Höcherl	8:59:31
100 kilometres	Birgit Lennartz-Lohrengel; LLG St. Augustin	7:38:14	Jutta Philippin; SpVgg Renningen	7:53:22	Anke Drescher; Karlsruher SC	8:02:07
100 kilometres team	DLC Aachen; Antje Küpper; Birgit Kieven; Simone Spellerberg-Rogowski	27:20:22	Only one team classified, thus championship was unofficial			
100 m hurdles	Kristin Patzwahl; LAC Halensee Berlin	13.12 s	Sabine Braun; TV Wattenscheid	13.31 s	Heike Tillack; TSV Kirchhain	13.36 s
400 m hurdles	Heike Meißner; Dresdner SC	54.52 s	Silvia Rieger; TuS Eintracht Hinte	55.07 s	Gesine Schmidt; ATS Cuxhaven	55.76 s
4 × 100 m relay	LG Olympia Dortmund; Mirja Knuth; Heike Lüningschroer; Katja Seidel; Silke-Beate Knoll	44.95 s	LG Bayer Leverkusen; Anja Böhme; Silke Lichtenhagen; Sandra Görigk; Bettina Oberdorf	45.15 s	LAC Quelle Fürth / München; Heike Blassneck; Monika Fehling; Christina Schönmetzler; Christina Gruhler	45.15 s
4 × 400 m relay	LG Olympia Dortmund; Andrea Bornscheuer; Sandra Kuschmann; Silvia Steimle; Silke-Beate Knoll	3:33.63 min	LG Bayer Leverkusen; Carolin Broich; Bettina Oberdorf; Ruth Scheppan; Linda Kisabaka	3:34.80 min	Berliner SC; Claudia Diefenbach; Nadja Hack; Martina Hauke; Anja Schmitz	3:39.00 min
3 × 800 m relay	ASV Köln; Karen Schiefer; Andrea Karhoff; Ellen Kiessling	6:26.27 min	LAC Quelle Fürth / München; Christine Stief; Kristina da Fonseca-Wollheim; Elke Dietel	6:28.39 min	TV Herxheim; K. Hoffmann; Kirsten Birmelin; M. Schultheiß	6:31.47 min
5000 m walk	Beate Gummelt; LAC Halensee Berlin	21:19.0 min	Kathrin Boyde; LC Breisgau	22:23.06 min	Doreen Sellenriek; Berliner SC	22:27.31 min
10 km walk	Beate Gummelt; LAC Halensee Berlin	43:58 min	Kathrin Boyde; LC Breisgau	45:13 min	Simone Thust; LAC Halensee Berlin	45:56 min
10 km walk team	LAC Halensee Berlin; Beate Gummelt; Simone Thust; Sandra Priemer	2:19:41 h	Only one team classified, thus championship was unofficial			
High jump	Heike Balck; Schweriner SC	1.90 m	Marion Hellman; LG Bayer Leverkusen	1.88 m	Manuela Aigner; AOK Leipzig Mila Froberg; LG Bayer Leverkusen	1.86 m
Pole vault	Andrea Müller; VT Zweibrücken	3.95 m	Christine Adams; SuS Dinslaken	3.90 m	Nicole Rieger; ASV Landau	3.75 m
Long jump	Heike Drechsler; TuS Jena	7.13 m	Sabine Braun; TV Wattenscheid	6.67 m	Helga Radtke; SC Empor Rostock	6.60 m
Triple jump	Helga Radtke; SC Empor Rostock	14.46 m NR	Petra Laux; LG Bayer Leverkusen	14.10 m	Ramona Molzan; OSC Berlin	13.92 m
Shot put	Stephanie Storp; VfL Wolfsburg	19.79 m	Grit Hammer; LAC Quelle Fürth / München	19.38 m	Astrid Kumbernuss; SC Neubrandenburg	19.28 m
Discus throw	Ilke Wyludda; SV Halle	63.76 m	Franka Dietzsch; SC Neubrandenburg	61.60 m	Jana Lauren; Berliner TSC	59.54 m
Hammer throw	Simone Mathes; LAC Quelle Fürth/München	58.34 m	Kirsten Münchow; LG Porta Westfalica	55.86 m	Inga Beyer; SV Holtland	55.24 m
Javelin throw	Karen Forkel; SV Halle	67.72 m	Tanja Damaske; OSC Berlin	64.24 m	Silke Gast; LAC Quelle Fürth / München	59.08 m
Heptathlon	Birgit Clarius; LAC Quelle Fürth/München	6109 pts	Mona Steigauf; USC Mainz	6099 pts	Gesine Schmidt; ATS Cuxhaven	5614 pts
Heptathlon team	LAC Quelle Fürth / München; Birgit Clarius; Heike Blassneck; Sabine Schwarz	16.430 pts	USC Mainz; Mona Steigauf; Ulrike Holzner; Ulrike Karst	16.306 pts	LG Sempt; Katrein Schröder; Bayer; Christine Huber	15.586 pts
Cross country short course – 3.8 km	Christina Mai; LG Olympia Dortmund	13:52 min	Doris Grossert; LG Braunschweig	13:59 min	Annette Hüls; LG Bayer Leverkusen	14:01 min
Cross country short course, Team	LG Braunschweig; Doris Grossert; Martina Lehmann; Katrin Bröger	15	LAC Quelle Fürth / München; Ute Haak; Sabine Leist; Vera Michallek	27	LG Bayer Leverkusen; Annette Hüls; Susanne Hüls; Nicole Theophil	32
Cross country long course – 7.3 km	Claudia Lokar; LG Olympia Dortmund	26:51 min	Claudia Dreher; LG Olympia Dortmund	27:29 min	Tanja Kalinowski; LG Bayer Leverkusen	28:15 min
Cross country long course, Team	LG Olympia Dortmund; Claudia Lokar; Claudia Dreher; Antje Pohlmann	13	Eintracht Frankfurt; Silke Welt; Gabriele Huber; Heike Möller	44	LAC Quelle Fürth / München; Johanna Baumgartner; Gabriele Almannstötter; Klothilde Staab	49
Mountain running	Romy Lindner; SV Blau-Weiß Auerbach	41:17 min	Sonja Ambrosy; LC Breisgau	41:41 min	Ute Haarmann; LG Wipperfürth	42:19 min
Mountain running team	LC Breisgau; Sonja Ambrosy; Barbara Guerike; Bettina Seith	2:08:16 h	LAC Quelle Fürth / München; Johanna Baumgartner; Silke Hennersdorf; Ursula Schedel	2:24:13 h	Turnerschaft Gundelfingen; Helga Matusza; Claudia Winski; Jäger	2:31:52 h
