= 2002 Asian Athletics Championships – Women's pole vault =

The women's pole vault event at the 2002 Asian Athletics Championships was held in Colombo, Sri Lanka on 10 August.

== Results ==
| Rank | Name | Nationality | Result | Notes |
|---|---|---|---|---|
| 1st place, gold medalist(s) | Gao Shuying | China | 4.20 | CR |
| 2nd place, silver medalist(s) | Masumi Ono | Japan | 4.20 | SB |
| 3rd place, bronze medalist(s) | Desy Margawati | Indonesia | 4.10 | NR |
| 4 | Qin Xia | China | 4.05 | =PB |
| 5 | Takayo Kondo | Japan | 4.05 | |
| 6 | Chang Ko-Hsin | Chinese Taipei | 3.90 | |
| | Jasmaniah Osman | Malaysia | NM | |
