= Ringa (surname) =

Ringa is a surname of Latvian origin. Notable people with this surname include:

- Elīna Ringa (born 1980), Latvian pole-vaulter
- Helēna Ringa (born 1947), Latvian long jumper

== See also ==
- Ringa Ropo-Junnila (born 1966), Finnish athlete
