= Ni Putu Desi Margawati =

Indonesian pole vaulter

Personal information
- Born: 19 December 1980 (age 45) Bima, West Nusa Tenggara, Indonesia

Sport
- Country: Indonesia
- Sport: Athletics
- Event: Pole vault
Medal record
Women's athletics
Representing Indonesia
Asian Indoor Games
Gold medal – first place	2007 Macau	Pole vault
Bronze medal – third place	2009 Hanoi	Pole vault
Asian Championships
Bronze medal – third place	2002 Colombo	Pole vault
Bronze medal – third place	2003 Manila	Pole vault
SEA Games
Gold medal – first place	2001 Kuala Lumpur	Pole vault
Gold medal – first place	2003 Hanoi	Pole vault
Bronze medal – third place	2011 Jakarta–Palembang	Pole vault

Ni Putu Desi Margawati (born 19 December 1980) is an Indonesian retired pole vaulter who enjoyed success on the continental level, especially around 2001–2003.

On the continental scene she finished fourth at the 2000 Asian Championships, won the bronze medal at the 2002 Asian Championships, finished fifth at the 2002 Asian Games and won the bronze medal at the 2003 Asian Championships, then a few years later won the gold medal at the 2007 Asian Indoor Games and the bronze medal at the 2009 Asian Indoor Games.

On the regional scene she won the gold medals at the 2001 (inaugural for women's pole vault) and 2003 SEA Games, finished fourth at the 2009 SEA Games and won the bronze medal at the 2011 SEA Games.

Her personal best jump is 4.10 metres, achieved at the 2002 Asian Championships. This is the Indonesian record.
