= Chang Ko-hsin =

Taiwanese pole vaulter (born 1980)

Medal record

Women's athletics

Representing Chinese Taipei

Asian Championships
Silver medal – second place	2000 Jakarta	Pole vault
Silver medal – second place	2005 Incheon	Pole vault

Asian Indoor Championships
Bronze medal – third place	2004 Tehran	Pole vault

Chang Ko-hsin (born 20 June 1980) is a retired Taiwanese pole vaulter.

She finished fifth at the 1998 Asian Games, won the silver medal at the 1999 Asian Junior Championships, won the silver medal at the 2000 Asian Championships, finished fifteenth at the 2001 Summer Universiade, sixth at the 2002 Asian Championships, sixth at the 2002 Asian Games, sixth at the 2003 Asian Championships, won the bronze medal at the 2004 Asian Indoor Championships and the silver medal at the 2005 Asian Championships. She also competed at the 1998 World Junior Championships without reaching the final.

Her personal best jump is 4.10 metres, achieved in April 2003 in Kaohsiung and then equalled twice in 2005. This was the Taiwanese record until 2018. She holds the Taiwanese indoor record with 4.00 metres, achieved in February 2004 in Kanonji.
