= Hoằng Hóa =

- Commune
- Interactive map of Hoằng Hóa
- Coordinates: 19.856383781007878°N 105.85431869276424°E
- Country: Vietnam
- Region: North Central Coast
- Province: Thanh Hóa
- Established: 16 June 2025
- Administrative headquarters: Đạo Sơn Hamlet

Area
  - Total: 35.16 km^{2} (13.58 sq mi)

Population (2024)
  - Total: 43,831
  - Density: 1,246/km^{2} (3,230/sq mi)
- Postal code: 40349
- Website: hoanghoa.thanhhoa.gov.vn

Hoằng Hóa is a commune in Thanh Hóa province, Vietnam. The commune inherited its name from the former Hoằng Hóa district.

On 16 June 2025, Hoằng Hóa district was dissolved as part of the 2025 Vietnamese administrative reform, which abolished the district-level administrative system. Hoằng Hóa Commune was established under Resolution No. 1686/NQ-UBTVQH15 of the Standing Committee of the National Assembly of Vietnam, through the merger of the entire area and population of Bút Sơn township and Hoằng Đức, Hoằng Đồng, Hoằng Đạo, Hoằng Hà, and Hoằng Đạt communes.
