= Athletics at the 2003 Pan American Games – Women's pole vault =

Women's pole vault at the Pan American Games

The Women's Pole Vault event at the 2003 Pan American Games took place on Saturday August 9, 2003. USA's Melissa Mueller set a new Pan Am record with a leap of 4.40 metres.

== Medalists ==
Gold	Melissa Mueller; United States
Silver	Carolina Torres; Chile
Bronze	Stephanie McCann; Canada

== Records ==
World Record	Yelena Isinbayeva (RUS)	4.82 m	July 13, 2003	(United Kingdom) Gateshead, England
Pan Am Record	Alejandra García (ARG)	4.30 m	July 28, 1999	Winnipeg, Canada

== Results ==
Rank	Athlete	Pole Vault						Final
Rank	Athlete	1	2	3	4	5	6	Result
1	Melissa Mueller (USA)	4.10-O	4.20-O	4.30-O	4.35-O	4.40-O	4.45-XXXX	4.40 m
2	Carolina Torres (CHI)	4.00-O	4.10-XO	4.20-O	4.30-O	4.35-X-	4.45-XX	4.30 m
3	Stephanie McCann (CAN)	4.00-O	4.10-O	4.20-O	4.30-XXXX			4.20 m
4	Kellie Suttle (USA)	4.10-O	4.20-XXXX					4.10 m
5	Katiuska Pérez (CUB)	3.80-O	3.90-XO	4.00-O	4.10-O	4.20-XXXX		4.10 m
6	Dana Ellis (CAN)	4.00-O	4.10-XXXX					4.00 m
7	Alejandra Meza (MEX)	3.60-O	3.80-XO	3.90-O	4.00-XXO	4.10-XXXX		4.00 m
8	Dennise Orengo (PUR)	3.80-O	3.90-O	4.00-XXXX				3.90 m
9	Michelle Vélez (PUR)	3.80-XO	3.90-XXXX					3.80 m
10	Déborah Gyurcsek (URU)	3.40-O	3.60-O	3.80-XXXX				3.60 m
11	Cecilia Villar (MEX)	3.60-XO	3.80-XXXX					3.60 m
—	Milena Agudelo (COL)							DNS
—	Alejandra García (ARG)							DNS

== See also ==
- 2003 World Championships in Athletics – Women's pole vault
- Athletics at the 2004 Summer Olympics – Women's pole vault
