= 2000 Asian Athletics Championships – Women's pole vault =

The women's pole vault event at the 2000 Asian Athletics Championships was held in Jakarta, Indonesia on 29 August.

== Results ==
Rank	Name	Nationality	3.20	3.40	3.50	3.60	3.70	3.80	3.90	4.00	4.05	4.10	Result	Notes
1st place, gold medalist(s)	Takayo Kondo	Japan	–	–	–	–	–	xxo	–	xo	–	xxx	4.00	=CR
2nd place, silver medalist(s)	Chang Ko-Hsin	Chinese Taipei	–	–	xo	–	o	o	xo	xx–	x		3.90	
3rd place, bronze medalist(s)	Masumi Ono	Japan	–	–	–	–	–	o	–	xxx			3.80	
4	Desy Margawati	Indonesia											3.70	NR
4	Roslinda Samsu	Malaysia											3.70	
6	Fong Len Tze	Malaysia											3.50	
7	Choi Yun-Hee	South Korea											3.20	
	Yang Hongling	China	–	–	–	–	xxx						NM	
	Yelena Reznik	Kazakhstan	–	–	–	xxx							NM	
	Kuan Mei-Lien	Chinese Taipei	–	xxx									NM	
