= Andrea Müller (athlete) =

German pole vaulter

Personal information
- Born: 29 June 1974 (age 52) Zweibrücken, West Germany

Sport
- Sport: Track and field

Andrea Müller (born 29 June 1974) is a German female former track and field athlete who competed in the pole vault. She was active during the early stages of the formal acceptance of women's pole vault into international programmes by the International Association of Athletics Federations. She briefly held the world record for the event, with a clearance of 4.18 m (13 ft 8 1/2 in) in August 1995. The former holder, Daniela Bártová, improved upon that the same month.

Internationally, she was a bronze medallist in the event at the 1994 Goodwill Games and took a silver medal at the 1997 European Cup. She was also a finalist at the 1996 European Athletics Indoor Championships and the 1997 Summer Universiade. She set a career best height of 4.30 m (14 ft 1 1/4 in) in May 1997, which was a European record.

She was twice national champion in the pole vault, taking the title at the German Athletics Championships in both 1994 and 1997, with Christine Adams winning in the intervening years.

== International competitions ==
Year	Competition	Venue	Position	Event	Notes
1994	Goodwill Games	Saint Petersburg, Russia	3rd	Pole vault	3.90 m
1996	European Indoor Championships	Stockholm, Sweden	5th	Pole vault	3.95 m
1997	European Cup	Munich, Germany	2nd	Pole vault	4.20 m
1997	Universiade	Catania, Italy	6th	Pole vault	4.10 m

== National titles ==
- German Athletics Championships
  - Pole vault: 1994, 1997

Records
Preceded by Daniela Bártová	Women's pole vault world record holder 5 August 1995 – 18 August 1995	Succeeded by Daniela Bártová
