= Hoằng Hóa district =

Coordinates: 19.850°N 105.850°E

Hoằng Hóa district Huyện Hoằng Hóa
- District
- Interactive map of Hoằng Hóa district
- Country: Vietnam
- Region: North Central Coast
- Province: Thanh Hóa
- Capital: Bút Sơn

Area
  - Total: 87 sq mi (225 km^{2})

Population (2018)
  - Total: 253,450
- Time zone: UTC+7 (UTC + 7)

Hoằng Hóa is a former district (huyện) of Thanh Hóa province in the North Central Coast region of Vietnam. As of 2003 the district had a population of 250,864. The district covers an area of 225 km^{2}. The district capital is in Bút Sơn.

== Administration ==
Hoang Hoa district has 37 affiliated commune-level administrative units, including Bút Sơn (district town) and 36 communes:

- Hoang Cat
- Hoang Chau
- Hoang Dao
- Hoang Dat
- Hoang Dong
- Hoang Duc
- Hoang Giang
- Hoang Ha
- Hoang Hai
- Hoang Hop
- Hoang Kim
- Hoang Loc
- Hoang Luu
- Hoang Ngoc
- Hoang Phong
- Hoang Phu
- Hoang Phuong
- Hoang Quy
- Hoang Son
- Hoang Tan
- Hoang Thai
- Hoang Thanh
- Hoang Thang
- Hoang Thinh
- Hoang Tien
- Hoang Trach
- Hoang Trinh
- Hoang Trung
- Hoang Truong
- Hoang Xuan
- Hoang Xuyen
- Hoang Yen
