= Elīna Ringa =

First official female Latvian pole vaulter

Elina Ringa
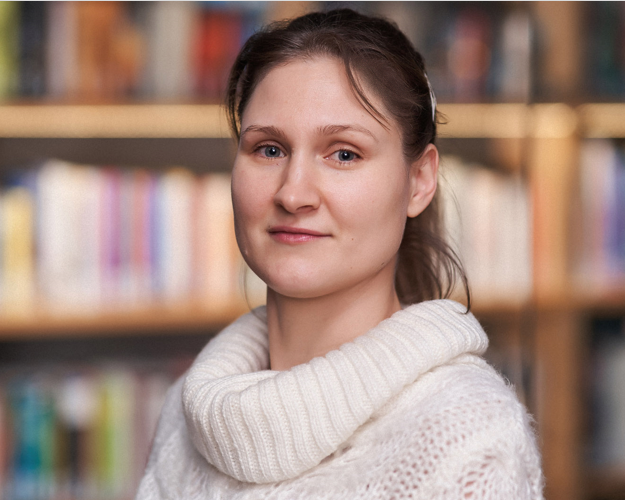

Personal information
- Native name: Elīna Ringa
- Born: 29 September 1980 (age 45) Riga, Latvia
- Education: University of Latvia

Sport
- Sport: Pole vaulting

Achievements and titles
- Personal bests: Outdoor: 3.80 m; Indoor: 3.75 m

Elīna Ringa is the first official female pole-vaulter in Latvia and also the first Latvian female national record holder in this event. She won the Latvian National Championship competition outdoors and indoors more than ten times.

Elina Ringa was born in Riga, the capital of Latvia, on 29 September, in 1980.

The first official record in Latvian athletics for female pole-vault was set by Elina at the Riga Championship in 1996, she vaulted at 2.60 m.

The national record was broken by Elina more than 15 times. Her last national record outdoor was 3.72 m, set in 2000 in Valmiera and indoor - 3,75 m, set in 2001 in Riga. Her all time personal best is 3,80 m, which she achieved in 2006.

She ended her professional athletic career in 2009 after serious ACL injury to her take-off leg, which required surgery.

Since summer 2021 Elina participates in masters athletics competitions. In 2022 she won bronze at World Masters Athletics championship in Tampere, Finland for W40 pole vault with result 2,70 m and in 2023 got 3rd place in European Masters Athletics championship in Pescara for W40 pole vault. In December of 2023 Elina jumped 2.80 m. And her best achievement in masters period is 2.90m

== Result progression ==
Elina set a new national record for pole-vault with a jump of 3.10 m in Riga, Latvia in 1996; her personal best at the time. In 1997, at Hyvinkää in Finland, she improved upon this by achieving 3.40 m, again setting the National Record.

In 2000, in Valmiera (a large town in the Vidzeme of Latvia), she vaulted to 3.72 , setting a new record there as well as improving upon her personal best. In 2006, in the same town, she achieved 3.80 m.

== Personal bests in other events ==
Elina has also competed in other athletic events. In the high jump, her personal best is 1.70 m. In the long jump, she has achieved 5.85 m.

In sprint events, she has run 100 m in 12.4 seconds, and 60 m in 7.6 seconds.

== Education ==
Elina studied at the University of Latvia, where she initially pursued Education Sciences before continuing her studies in Applied Computer Science. In 2012, she successfully completed a master's degree in Computer Science (IT field) at the Faculty of Computing.

== Job ==
Elina has diverse professional experience across education, information technology, and consulting. She began her career as a Teacher of Sports for handicapped children, a Teacher of Applied Computer Science, and a Trainer of corporate Computer courses. She later built extensive experience in IT support and consulting before expanding her expertise into systems administration, software testing, business analysis, project management, and solution architecture. Currently, Elina continues to work in the IT and services field.

Since 2021, Elina has also been consulting and coaching young pole vaulters.

== Publications ==
Elina has written study materials about Microsoft Office applications 2000-2007, Windows 2000/XP, HTML/CSS, MOSS 2007 and others. Her book, "Microsoft Excel 2007. Strādāsim ātrāk, ērtāk un efektīvāk!" ("Let's work faster, easier and more efficiently!"), was published by Turiba. and bought by many educational institutions and bookstores.
