= Gao Shuying =

Chinese pole vaulter

Personal information
- Born: October 28, 1979 (age 47) Qingdao, Shandong, China

Sport
- Sport: Track and field
Medal record
Representing China
Asian Games
| Gold medal – first place | 2002 Busan | Pole vault |
| Gold medal – first place | 2006 Doha | Pole vault |
Asian Championships
| Gold medal – first place | 2002 Colombo | Pole vault |
| Gold medal – first place | 2005 Incheon | Pole vault |
Summer Universiade
| Gold medal – first place | 2001 Beijing | Pole vault |

Gao Shuying (Chinese: 高淑英; pinyin: Gāo Shúyīng, born October 28, 1979) is a Chinese pole vaulter.

At the 2004 Summer Olympics, she was eliminated in the first round of the pole vault competition.

Her personal best is 4.64 metres, achieved in 2007 in New York City.

== Achievements ==
| Year | Competition | Venue | Position | Notes |
Representing China
| 1998 | World Junior Championships | Annecy, France | 8th | 3.90 m (=PB) |
| 1999 | Universiade | Palma de Mallorca, Spain | 16th (q) | 3.90 m |
| 2000 | Olympic Games | Sydney, Australia | 10th | 4.15 m |
| 2001 | East Asian Games | Osaka, Japan | 1st | 4.20 m |
| 2001 | World Championships | Edmonton, Canada | 5th | 4.50 m |
| 2001 | Universiade | Beijing, China | 1st | 4.52 m (CR, PB) |
| 2002 | Asian Championships | Colombo, Sri Lanka | 1st | 4.20 m (CR) |
| 2002 | World Cup | Madrid, Spain | 4th | 4.30 m |
| 2002 | Asian Games | Busan, South Korea | 1st | 4.35 m (CR) |
| 2003 | World Indoor Championships | Birmingham, United Kingdom | – | NM |
| 2003 | World Championships | Paris, France | 9th | 4.35 m |
| 2003 | Asian Championships | Manila, Philippines | 4th | 3.80 m |
| 2004 | World Indoor Championships | Budapest, Hungary | 13th (q) | 4.20 m |
| 2004 | Olympic Games | Athens, Greece | 24th (q) | 4.15 m |
| 2005 | World Championships | Helsinki, Finland | 5th | 4.50 m |
| 2005 | Asian Championships | Incheon, South Korea | 1st | 4.53 m (CR, PB) |
| 2006 | World Cup | Athens, Greece | 3rd | 4.50 m (SB) |
| 2006 | Asian Games | Doha, Qatar | 1st | 4.30 m |
| 2007 | World Championships | Osaka, Japan | 14th (q) | 4.50 m |
| 2008 | Olympic Games | Beijing, China | 12th | 4.45 m |
| 2009 | World Championships | Berlin, Germany | – | NM |
