= Masumi Ono =

Japanese pole vaulter

Personal information
- Nationality: Japanese
- Born: 5 December 1975 (age 50) Hokuto, Hokkaido, Japan
- Education: Hokkaido University of Education
- Height: 1.61 m (5 ft 3 in)
- Weight: 52 kg (115 lb)

Sport
- Country: Japan
- Sport: Track and field
- Event: Pole vault
- Personal best(s): Outdoor: 4.21 m (2003); Indoor: 4.30 m (2002)
Medal record
Women's athletics
Representing Japan
Asian Games
Silver medal – second place	1998 Bangkok	Pole vault
Silver medal – second place	2002 Busan	Pole vault
Asian Championships
Silver medal – second place	1998 Fukuoka	Pole vault
Silver medal – second place	2002 Colombo	Pole vault
Bronze medal – third place	2000 Jakarta	Pole vault

Masumi Ono (小野真澄, Ono Masumi; born 5 December 1975 in Hokuto, Hokkaido) is a retired Japanese athlete who specialised in the pole vault. She was the first Japanese female vaulter to jump over 4 metres. She won multiple medals at the continental level.

She has personal bests of 4.21 metres outdoors (2003) and 4.30 metres indoors (2002).

== Personal bests ==
Event	Height	Competition	Venue	Date	Notes
Outdoor	4.21 m	Japanese Championships	Shizuoka, Japan	6 June 2003	Former NR
Indoor	4.30 m	Japan-China Indoor Match	Tianjin, China	3 March 2002	Former NIR

== Competition record ==
Year	Competition	Venue	Position	Notes
Representing Japan
1998	Asian Championships	Fukuoka, Japan	2nd	3.80 m
1998	Asian Games	Bangkok, Thailand	2nd	4.00 m
1999	World Indoor Championships	Maebashi, Japan	12th	4.20 m
2000	Asian Championships	Jakarta, Indonesia	3rd	3.80 m
2002	Asian Championships	Colombo, Sri Lanka	2nd	4.20 m
2002	Asian Games	Busan, South Korea	2nd	4.10 m
2003	World Championships	Paris, France	22nd (q)	4.00 m
2003	Asian Championships	Manila, Philippines	5th	3.80 m

== National titles ==
- Japanese Championships
  - Pole vault: 1998, 1999, 2003
