= Maria Carla Bresciani =

Italian pole vaulter

Personal information
- National team: Italy: 10 caps (1996-2000)
- Born: 16 July 1973 (age 53) Riva del Garda, Italy

Sport
- Sport: Athletics
- Event: Pole vault
- Club: G.S. Fiamme Oro

Achievements and titles
- Personal best: Pole vault: 4.20 m (2000)

Maria Carla Bresciani (born 16 July 1973) is a former Italian female pole vaulter who won nine national championships at individual senior level from 1995 to 2004.

== Biography ==
In the early 1990s, Bresciani was a pioneer of the specialty of the pole vault that was born at the female level in those years throughout the world. Her best result on the international senior level was the final reached in the pole vault at the 1997 IAAF World Indoor Championships held in Paris.

She is married to former pole vaulter Fabio Pizzolato.

== National record ==
- Long jump: 4.06 m (Turin, 14 September 1996), her last of 13 Record was broken by Francesca Dolcini on 8 February 1998 with 4.10 m.

== Achievements ==
Year	Competition	Venue	Position	Event	Measure	Notes
1997	World Indoor Championships	(France) Paris	Final	Pole vault	4.00 m	NR

== National titles ==
- Italian Athletics Championships
  - Pole vault: 1995, 1997, 1999, 2001, 2004 (5)
- Italian Athletics Indoor Championships
  - Pole vault: 1995, 1996, 1997, 2003 (4)
