= Takayo Kondo =

Japanese pole vaulter

Personal information
- Nationality: Japanese
- Born: 17 November 1975 (age 50) Ōtsu, Shiga, Japan
- Education: Waseda University
- Height: 1.60 m (5 ft 3 in)
- Weight: 56 kg (123 lb)

Sport
- Country: Japan
- Sport: Track and field
- Event: Pole vault

Achievements and titles
- Personal best: 4.35 m (2004, 2007, 2009)
Medal record
Women's athletics
Representing Japan
Asian Championships
Gold medal – first place	2000 Jakarta	Pole vault
Silver medal – second place	2003 Manila	Pole vault
Asian Indoor Championships
Bronze medal – third place	2008 Doha	Pole vault
East Asian Games
Silver medal – second place	2001 Osaka	Pole vault

Takayo Kondo (近藤 高代, Kondō Takayo; born 17 November 1975 in Ōtsu, Shiga) is a retired Japanese athlete specialising in the pole vault. She competed at the 2004 Summer Olympics and three consecutive World Championships each time failing to qualify for the final. She was the gold medalist at the 2000 Asian Athletics Championships.

She has personal bests of 4.35 metres outdoors and 4.20 metres indoors.

== Personal bests ==
Event	Height	Competition	Venue	Date	Notes
Outdoor	4.35 m	Chukyo University Meet	Toyota, Japan	29 May 2004	Former NR
Outdoor	4.35 m	World Championships	Osaka, Japan	26 August 2007	
Outdoor	4.35 m	Japanese Championships	Hiroshima, Japan	25 June 2009	
Indoor	4.20 m		Kalbach-Riedberg, Germany	30 January 2008	

== Competition record ==
Year	Competition	Venue	Position	Notes
Representing Japan
1998	Asian Games	Bangkok, Thailand	4th	3.90 m
2000	Asian Championships	Jakarta, Indonesia	1st	4.00 m
2001	East Asian Games	Osaka, Japan	2nd	4.05 m
2002	Asian Championships	Colombo, Sri Lanka	5th	4.05 m
2002	Asian Games	Busan, South Korea	4th	4.00 m
2003	Asian Championships	Manila, Philippines	2nd	4.10 m
2004	Olympic Games	Athens, Greece	32nd (q)	4.15 m
2005	World Championships	Helsinki, Finland	17th (q)	4.15 m
2005	Asian Championships	Incheon, South Korea	8th	4.00 m
2007	World Championships	Osaka, Japan	25th (q)	4.35 m
2008	Asian Indoor Championships	Doha, Qatar	3rd	4.10 m
2009	World Championships	Berlin, Germany	28th (q)	4.10 m
2009	Asian Championships	Guangzhou, China	–	NM

== National titles ==
- Japanese Championships
  - Pole vault: 2001, 2002, 2004, 2005, 2007, 2009
