= Kym Howe =

Australian pole vaulter

Kym Michelle Howe-Nadin (born 12 June 1980 in Perth, Western Australia) is an Australian athlete competing in the pole vault. She has an indoor personal best of 4.72 metres, achieved in February 2007 in Donetsk.

== Achievements ==
| Year | Competition | Venue | Position | Notes |
Representing Australia
| 1998 | World Junior Championships | Annecy, France | 11th | 3.90 m |
| 2002 | Commonwealth Games | Manchester, England | 2nd | 4.15 m |
| 2004 | Olympic Games | Athens, Greece | 16th | 4.30 m |
| 2006 | Commonwealth Games | Melbourne, Australia | 1st | 4.62 m PB |
| 2006 | World Athletics Final | Stuttgart, Germany | 7th | 4.50 m |
