= Melina Hamilton =

New Zealand pole vaulter (born 1976)

Personal information
- Born: 15 June 1976 (age 50) Rotorua, New Zealand

Sport
- Sport: Track and field

Melina Dawn Hamilton (born 15 June 1976) is a retired New Zealand athlete who specialised in the pole vault. She represented her country at the 2004 Summer Olympics, as well as two World Championships, without reaching the final.

Her personal bests of 4.40 metres outdoors (2003) and 4.20 metres indoors (2004) were at the time national records; both were broken in 2014 by Eliza McCartney.

== Competition record ==
Year	Competition	Venue	Position	Event	Notes
Representing New Zealand
1993	Oceania Youth Championships	Canberra, Australia	2nd	800 m	2:21.05
1993	Oceania Youth Championships	Canberra, Australia	1st	High jump	1.55 m
1993	Oceania Youth Championships	Canberra, Australia	2nd	Javelin throw	37.34 m
1996	Oceania Championships	Townsville, Australia	2nd	100 m hurdles	14.92 s (w)
1996	Oceania Championships	Townsville, Australia	1st	Pole vault	3.60 m
1997	Universiade	Catania, Italy	16th (q)	Pole vault	3.60 m
1998	Commonwealth Games	Kuala Lumpur, Malaysia	7th	Pole vault	3.90 m
2002	Commonwealth Games	Manchester, United Kingdom	9th	Pole vault	3.90 m
2003	World Championships	Paris, France	22nd (q)	Pole vault	4.00 m
2004	World Indoor Championships	Budapest, Hungary	16th (q)	Pole vault	4.20 m
2004	Olympic Games	Athens, Greece	24th (q)	Pole vault	4.15 m
2005	World Championships	Helsinki, Finland	20th (q)	Pole vault	4.15 m
2006	Commonwealth Games	Melbourne, Australia	8th	Pole vault	4.15 m
