= Ringa Monastery =

Buddhist monastery in Yunnan, China

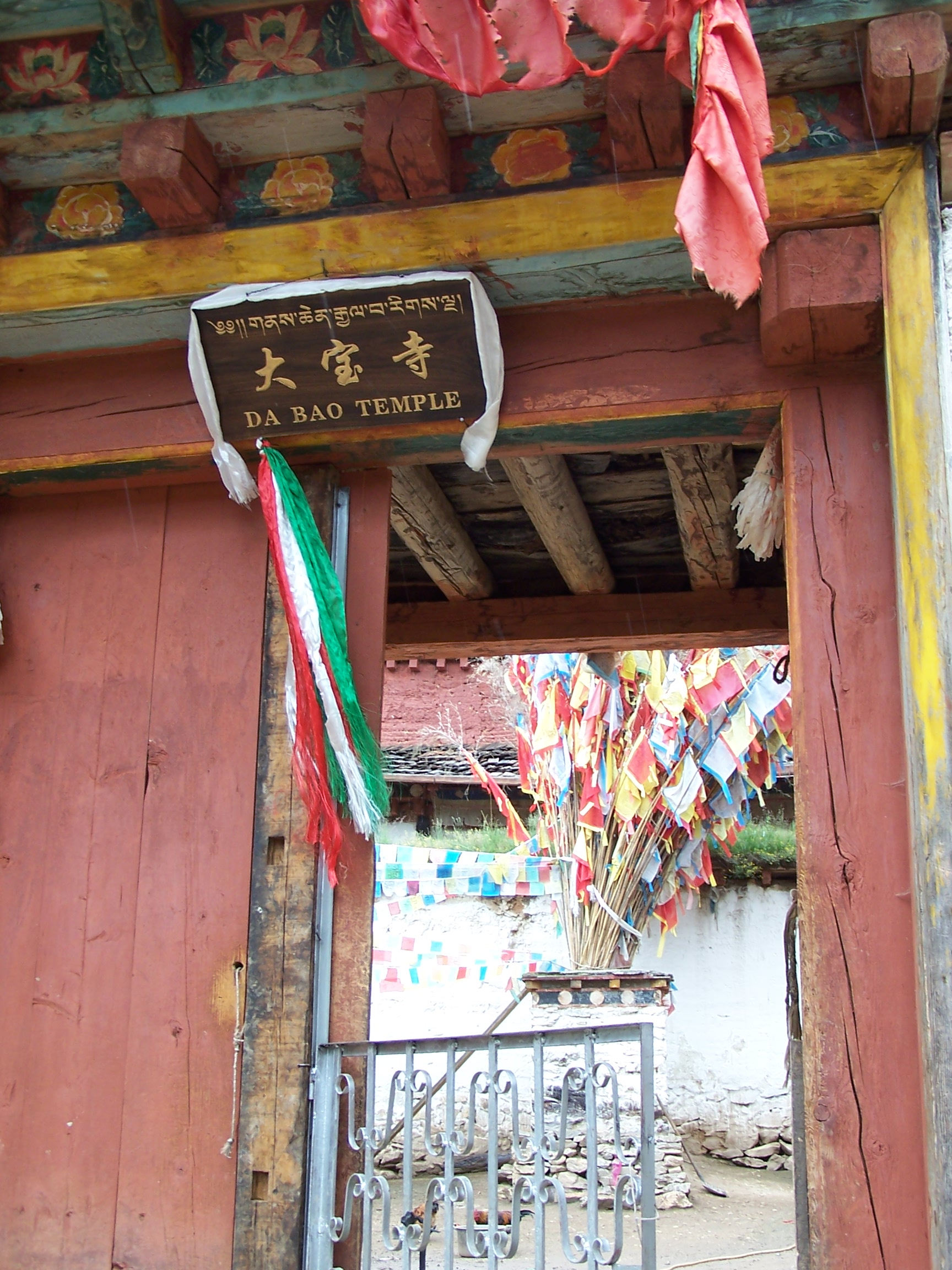

Religion
- Affiliation: Tibetan Buddhism

Location
- Location: Yunnan, China
- Country: China
- Interactive map of Ringa Monastery
- Coordinates: 27°46′03″N 99°46′21″E

Ringa Monastery (Chinese: 大宝寺) is a Buddhist monastery in Yunnan, China. It's located next to Banyan Tree.
