= Sabine Schulte =

German pole vaulter (born 1976)

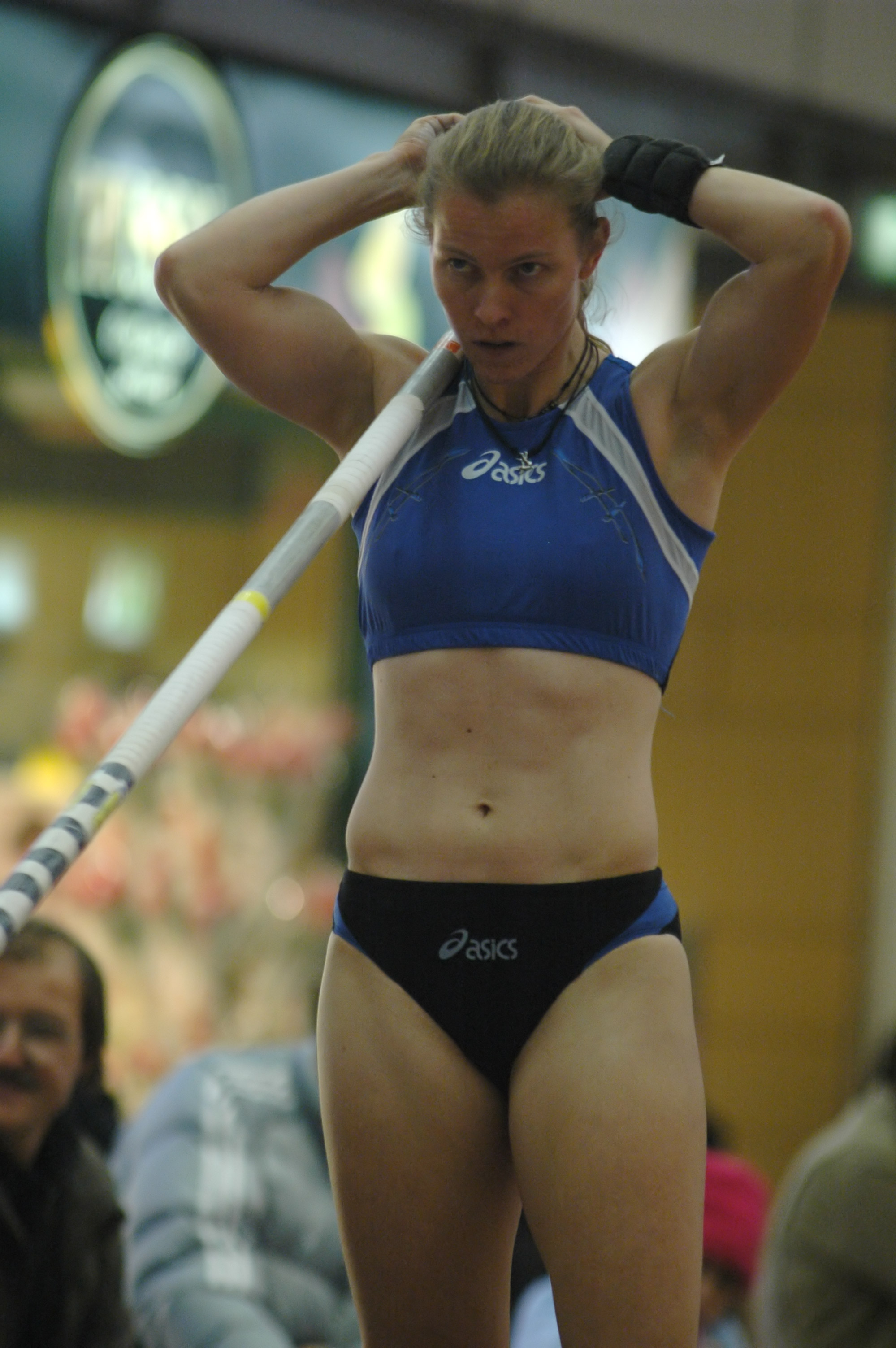
- Schulte in 2007

Personal information
- Born: 29 January 1976 (age 50) Bonn, West Germany

Sport
- Sport: Athletics
- Event: Pole vault
- Retired: 2007
Medal record
Women's athletics
Representing Germany
U23 European Championships
Bronze medal – third place	1997 Turku	Pole vault
Universiade
Silver medal – second place	2001 Beijing	Pole vault
German Championships
Gold medal – first place	1998 Berlin	Pole vault
German Indoor Championships
Gold medal – first place	1997 Dortmund	Pole vault

Sabine Schulte (born 29 January 1976) is a former German pole vaulter.

== Career ==
In 1997, she became the German Indoor Champion and competed at the World Indoor Championships in Paris. During the outdoor season, she won a bronze medal at the U23 European Championships in Turku and placed fourth at the Universiade in Catania.

In 1998, Schulte won the German Outdoor Championship with a vault of 4.25 meters.

In 2000, she competed in the European Indoor Championships in Ghent, finishing in sixth place. On 10 September 2000, Schulte finished runner-up to Tiffany Lott-Hogan at a women's decathlon competition in Lage, North Rhine-Westphalia. Her score of 7,082 points makes her the #19 all-time performer in the event as of 2025.

In 2001, she won a silver medal at the Summer Universiade in Beijing with a jump of 4.35 meters.

In 2002, she set her personal best with a jump of 4.40 meters. She retired in 2007.

== Personal life ==
Sabine Schulte is married and lives in Schleswig-Holstein. In 2009, she became the state pole vault coach.

== Achievements ==
Pentathlon

- U14 State Champion

Pole vault

- 1994 West German Youth Champion with 3.35 m
- 1995 Named to the B-team with 3.75 m
- 1997 German Indoor Champion
- 1997 Bronze medal at the U23 European Championships in Turku
- 1998 German Champion
- 2000 6th place at the European Indoor Championships in Ghent
- 2001 Silver medal at the Universiade in Beijing
- 2006 German W30 record with 4.20 m

Sabine Schulte is also a six-time German University Champion. She has achieved 233 official jumps over four meters.

== Clubs ==
- SpVgg Lülsdorf-Ranzel
- LG Bonn/Troisdorf/Niederkassel
- LC Bonn
- Halstenbecker TS

== Literature ==
- Klaus Amrhein: Biographisches Handbuch zur Geschichte der Deutschen Leichtathletik 1898–2005. 2 volumes. Published in Darmstadt 2005 by the Deutsche Leichtathletik Promotion- und Projektgesellschaft.
