= V. S. Surekha =

Indian pole vaulter

Personal information
- Full name: Surekha Vazhapilli Suresh
- Nationality: Indian
- Born: 14 August 1984 (age 42) Kerala, India

Sport
- Country: India
- Sport: Track and field athletics
- Event: Pole vault

Achievements and titles
- Regional finals: Indian: 2003, 2004, 2006
- Personal bests: 4.15 m (New Delhi 2014) NR
- Updated on 5 November 2014

V. S. Surekha (born 14 August 1984) is an Indian pole vaulter. She holds the current national record of 4.15 m set at National Open Championships held at New Delhi in 2014. Surekha is the first Indian female pole vaulter to clear 4.00 meters.

== Early life ==
Surekha was born in the southern state of Kerala. Her interest in sports started during her childhood as a long jumper. During high school she started practicing pole vault under Coach Nagaraj of Prime Sports Academy in Chennai and with technical help from former pole vaulter Manick Raj, she was able to train for the national Level.

== Career ==
She set her first national record of 3.51 m, at the 43rd Open National Athletic Championship in Bangalore on 28 September 2003. She bettered the record clearing 4.15 meters at the National Open Championships in New Delhi, in November 2014.

She has represented India at Doha Asian Games in 2006 and Asian Championship Guangzhou in November 2009. A summary of performance of the athlete is given in Table 1.

Table 1
Year	Performance	Venue	Remarks
2003	3.51 m	43rd Open National Athletic Championship in Bangalore on 28 September 2003.	National Record
2006	3.85m	New Delhi National Championships	
2006	4.08m	3rd National Athletics Circuit Meet, Patiala	Crossed 4m mark.
2014	4.15m	National Open Championships held at New Delhi 4 November 2014	Bettered her record of eight years and set new national record

== Personal life ==
She is married to the triple jumper and former national record holder Renjith Maheshwary and is a mother of two daughters Jiya and Sparsha. She set the national record of 4.15m in 2014 when she was the mother of a four-year-old daughter

She is an employee of Southern Railways
