= Dana Ellis =

Canadian pole vaulter (born 1979)

Personal information
- Nationality: Canadian
- Born: December 7, 1979 (age 46) Kitchener, Ontario
- Education: Tulane University

Sport
- Sport: pole vault

Dana Ellis (born December 7, 1979) is a Canadian former pole vaulter.

At the 2004 Summer Olympics, Ellis finished in a four-way tie for sixth place in the women's pole vault event. Her personal best is 4.52 metres, achieved in August 2007 in California. After her athletic career, she attended medical school at Tulane University in New Orleans, Louisiana.

• 7th ranked pole vaulter in the world in 2005/2006
• Indoor and Outdoor Canadian National Record Holder in the Women's pole vault between 2000 and 2008
• 6th place at the 2002 Commonwealth Games
• 5th place at the 2003 Pan American Games
• 1st place at the 2004 Canadian National Track and Field Championships
• 6th place at the 2004 Olympic Games
• 2004 Canadian Field Athlete of the Year
• 1st place at the 2005 Canadian National Track and Field Championships and new Canadian Record (14'10''/ 4.51m)
• 6th place at the 2005 World Championships
• 5th place at the 2005 IAAF World Athletic Grand Prix Final
• 4th place at the 2006 Commonwealth Games
• New Canadian Record (4.52m) August 18, 2007
• Winner of the 2008 Grand Prix in Osaka, Japan May 10, 2008

== Notable Achievements ==
Year	Competition	Venue	Position	Notes
Representing Canada
2000	NACAC U-25 Championships	Monterrey, Mexico	2nd	3.80m
2001	Universiade	Beijing, China	12th	3.90 m
2002	NACAC U-25 Championships	San Antonio, Texas, United States	2nd	4.00 m
2003	Pan American Games	Santo Domingo, Dominican Republic	6th	4.00 m
2004	Olympic Games	Athens, Greece	6th	4.40 m
2005	World Championships	Helsinki, Finland	6th	4.35 m
2005	World Athletics Final	Monte Carlo, Monaco	5th	4.35 m
2006	Commonwealth Games	Melbourne, Australia	4th	4.25 m
