= Amandine Homo =

French pole vaulter

Personal information
- Nationality: France
- Born: 24 December 1980 (age 45) Rosny-sous-Bois, France
- Years active: 1997–2006

Sport
- Event: Pole vault
- Club: Dynamic Aulnay Club

Amandine Homo (born 24 December 1980) is a former French athlete who specialized in the pole vault. She is the older sister of Sébastien Homo, who is also a pole vaulter. Since her retirement from active competition, Amandine Homo has coached children at her club, the Dynamic Aulnay Club.

== Prize list ==
Date	Competition	Location	Result	Performance
1996	France Championships	Bondoufle	1st	4.00 m
1997	Indoor World Championships	Paris-Bercy	10th	3.90 m
1998	France Championships	Dijon	1st	4.15 m
1999	France Championships	Niort	1st	4.20 m

== Records ==
Event		Performance	Location	Date
Pole vault	Indoors	4.31 m	Poissy	21 January 2000
Pole vault	Outdoors	4.31 m	Saint-Denis	3 August 1999

== Notes and references ==
- Fédération Française d'Athlétisme (2003), Docathlé 2003, pp. 42, 176, 195, 215, 409, ISBN 2-9512343-3-3
