= Daniela Bártová =

Czech pole vaulter and gymnast

Personal information
- Born: 6 May 1974 (age 52) Ostrava, Czechoslovakia

Sport
- Sport: Track and field
Medal record
Representing Czech Republic
European Indoor Championships
Silver medal – second place	1998 Valencia	Pole vault

Daniela Bártová-Břečková (Czech pronunciation: [ˈdanɪjɛla ˈbaːrtovaː ˈbr̝ɛtʃkovaː]; born 6 May 1974) is a Czech retired athlete.

== Life and career ==
She was born in Ostrava. Originally a gymnast, her coach persuaded her to be a pole vaulter. She set nine world records in the mid-1990s, but she lost it on 25 November 1995 to Sun Caiyun and was unable to recapture it. Her personal best is 4.51 m (Bratislava, Slovakia, 9 June 1998).

Despite her success she only won one international medal, a silver medal at the 1998 European Indoor Championships.

As a gymnast, she represented the Czech Republic at the 1991 World Artistic Gymnastics Championships, placing 33rd in the all-around event. She also took part in the 1992 Summer Olympics, but was eliminated in the qualifying rounds.

In 2001, Bártová decided to retire her sports career due to problems with her Achilles tendon.

Bártová is married to flatwater canoer Jan Břečka. In December, 2002 they had a son named Jan, after his father.

== World records ==
- 4.12 m – Duisburg, Germany, 18 June 1995
- 4.13 m – Wesel, Germany, 24 June 1995
- 4.14 m – Gateshead, England, 2 July 1995
- 4.15 m – Ostrava, Czech Republic, 6 July 1995
- 4.16 m – Feldkirch, Austria, 14 July 1995
- 4.17 m – Feldkirch, Austria, 15 July 1995
- 4.20 m – Cologne, Germany, 18 August 1995
- 4.21 m – Linz, Austria, 22 August 1995
- 4.22 m – Salgotarjan, Hungary, 11 September 1995

== Competition record ==
Year	Competition	Venue	Position	Notes
Representing the Czech Republic
1996	European Indoor Championships	Stockholm, Sweden	6th	3.95 m
1997	World Indoor Championships	Paris, France	5th	4.20 m
1997	Universiade	Catania, Italy	8th	4.00 m
1998	European Indoor Championships	Valencia, Spain	2nd	4.40 m
1998	Goodwill Games	Uniondale, United States	9th	4.00 m
1998	European Championships	Budapest, Hungary	20th (q)	4.00 m
1999	World Championships	Seville, Spain	6th	4.40 m
2000	European Indoor Championships	Ghent, Belgium	3rd (q)	4.30 m
2000	Olympic Games	Sydney, Australia	4th	4.50 m

Records
Preceded by Sun Caiyun	Women's pole vault world record holder 18 June 1995 – 5 August 1995	Succeeded by Andrea Müller
Preceded by Andrea Müller	Women's pole vault world record holder 18 August 1995 – 4 November 1995	Succeeded by Sun Caiyun
