= Cai Weiyan =

Chinese pole vaulter

Personal information
- Born: 25 October 1973 (age 53) Anhui, China

Sport
- Sport: Track and field
Medal record
Representing China
World Indoor Championships
Bronze medal – third place	1997 Paris	Pole vault
Asian Games
Gold medal – first place	1998 Bangkok	Pole vault
Summer Universiade
Silver medal – second place	1997 Catania	Pole vault

Cai Weiyan (Chinese: 蔡维艳; born 25 October 1973) is a retired athlete who specialised in the pole vault. She won the bronze medal at the 1997 World Indoor Championships and the silver at the 1997 Summer Universiade.

Her personal bests are 4.33 metres outdoors (Shenzhen 1996) and 4.35 metres indoors (Paris 1997).

== Competition record ==
Year	Competition	Venue	Position	Notes
Representing China
1997	World Indoor Championships	Paris, France	3rd	4.35 m
1997	Universiade	Catania, Italy	2nd	4.35 m
1998	Asian Games	Bangkok, Thailand	1st	4.00 m
1999	World Indoor Championships	Maebashi, Japan	16th	4.05 m
