= Zhao Yingying =

Chinese pole vaulter

Zhao Yingying (born 15 February 1986) is a Chinese pole vaulter.

She won the silver medal at the 2004 World Junior Championships and the bronze medal at the 2006 Asian Games. She also competed at the 2004 Olympic Games, the 2005 World Championships and the 2006 World Indoor Championships without reaching the final round.

Her personal best jump is 4.245 metres (indoor), achieved in February 2005 in Madrid.
