= Emma George =

Australian pole vaulter

Personal information
- Born: 1 November 1974 (age 52) Beechworth, Victoria, Australia

Sport
- Sport: Track and field
Medal record
Representing Australia
World Indoor Championships
Silver medal – second place	1997 Paris	Pole vault
Commonwealth Games
Gold medal – first place	1998 Kuala Lumpur	Pole vault
Summer Universiade
Gold medal – first place	1997 Catania	Pole vault

Emma Louise George (born 1 November 1974) is a former Australian pole vaulter. She held the world record from 30 November 1995 until 26 May 2000, setting a new record on twelve occasions, before being passed by Stacy Dragila. She was previously a trapeze artist in The Flying Fruit Fly Circus. She was coached by Mark Stewart, who also led Steve Hooker to Olympic gold.

George competed in and won the Gladiator Individual Sports Athletes Challenge in 1995.

George suffered a fall while training for the 1999 World Athletics Championships in Seville. She then underwent a number of operations on her back before finally announcing her retirement in 2003.

== World records ==
- 4.25 m - Melbourne, Australia 30 November 1995
- 4.28 m - Perth, Western Australia 17 December 1995
- 4.30 m - Perth, Western Australia 28 January 1996
- 4.41 m - Perth, Australia 28 January 1996
- 4.42 m - Reims, France 29 June 1996
- 4.45 m - Sapporo, Japan 14 July 1996
- 4.50 m - Melbourne, Western Australia 8 February 1997
- 4.55 m - Melbourne, Australia 20 February 1997
- 4.57 m - North Shore City, New Zealand 21 February 1998
- 4.58 m - South Melbourne, Australia 14 March 1998
- 4.59 m - Brisbane, Australia 21 March 1998
- 4.60 m - Sydney, Australia 20 February 1999

== Achievements ==
Representing Australia
Year	Competition	Venue	Position	Notes
1997	World Indoor Championships	Paris, France	2nd	4.35 m
1997	Universiade	Catania, Italy	1st	4.40 m
1998	Goodwill Games	Uniondale, United States	2nd	4.30 m
1998	Commonwealth Games	Kuala Lumpur, Malaysia	1st	4.20 m
1999	World Indoor Championships	Maebashi, Japan	6th	4.35 m
1999	World Championships	Seville, Spain	14th	4.15 m
2000	Olympic Games	Sydney, Australia	15th (q)	4.25 m

Records
Preceded by (China) Sun Caiyun	Women's Pole Vault World Record Holder; 30 November 1995 – 26 May 2000	Succeeded by (United States) Stacy Dragila
