= Cassandra Kelly (athlete) =

New Zealand retired athlete

Personal information
- Full name: Cassandra Lee Kelly
- Born: 29 June 1963 (age 62)

Sport
- Country: New Zealand
- Sport: Track and field
- Events: Heptathlon; pole vault; hurdles

Achievements and titles
- National finals: Heptathlon champion (1989, 1993); Pole vault champion (1996)

Cassandra Lee Kelly (born 29 June 1963) is a retired athlete from New Zealand. She represented her country in pole vault, heptathlon and hurdles in two Commonwealth Games.

In 1990, Kelly competed at the Commonwealth Games in Auckland in the 100m hurdles and the heptathlon, in which she was placed ninth. That year, she was awarded the New Zealand 1990 Commemoration Medal. Kelly competed at the 1998 Commonwealth Games in Kuala Lumpur in pole vault, finishing in seventh position. Kelly also competed at the Australian Track and Field Championships in 1990. In 1996 she held the New Zealand record for women's pole vaulting.
