= Stacy Dragila =

American pole vaulter

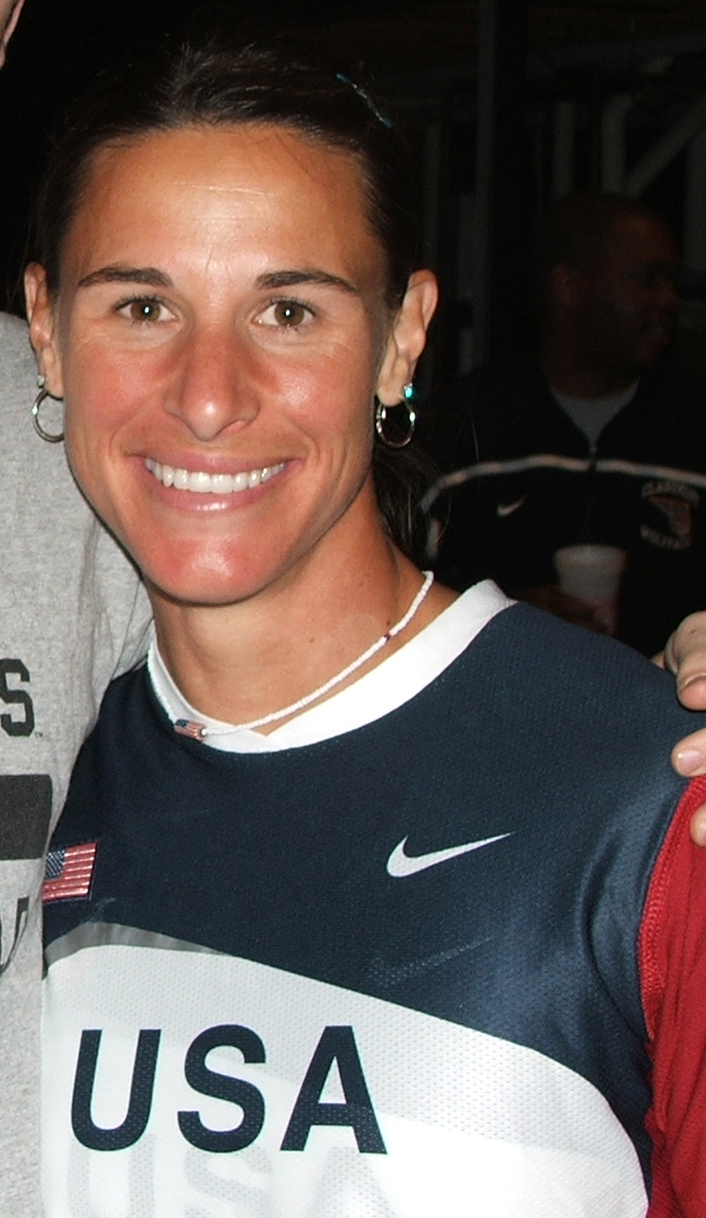
- Dragila at the 2005 Reno Pole Vault Summit

Personal information
- Born: Stacy Renée Mikaelsen; March 25, 1971 (age 55) Auburn, California, U.S.
- Height: 5 ft 7+1/2 in (1.72 m)
- Weight: 137 lb (62 kg)

Sport
- Country: United States
- Sport: Athletics
- Event: Pole vault
- Club: Nike, Beaverton

Achievements and titles
- Personal best: Pole vault: 4.83 (2004)
Medal record
Women's athletics
Representing United States
Olympic Games
Gold medal – first place	2000 Sydney	Pole vault
World Championships
Gold medal – first place	1999 Seville	Pole vault
Gold medal – first place	2001 Edmonton	Pole vault
World Indoor Championships
Gold medal – first place	1997 Paris	Pole vault
Silver medal – second place	2004 Budapest	Pole vault

Stacy Renée Mikaelson, married Stacy Renée Dragila, (March 25, 1971) is a former American pole vaulter. She is an Olympic gold medalist and a multiple-time world champion.

== Early life ==
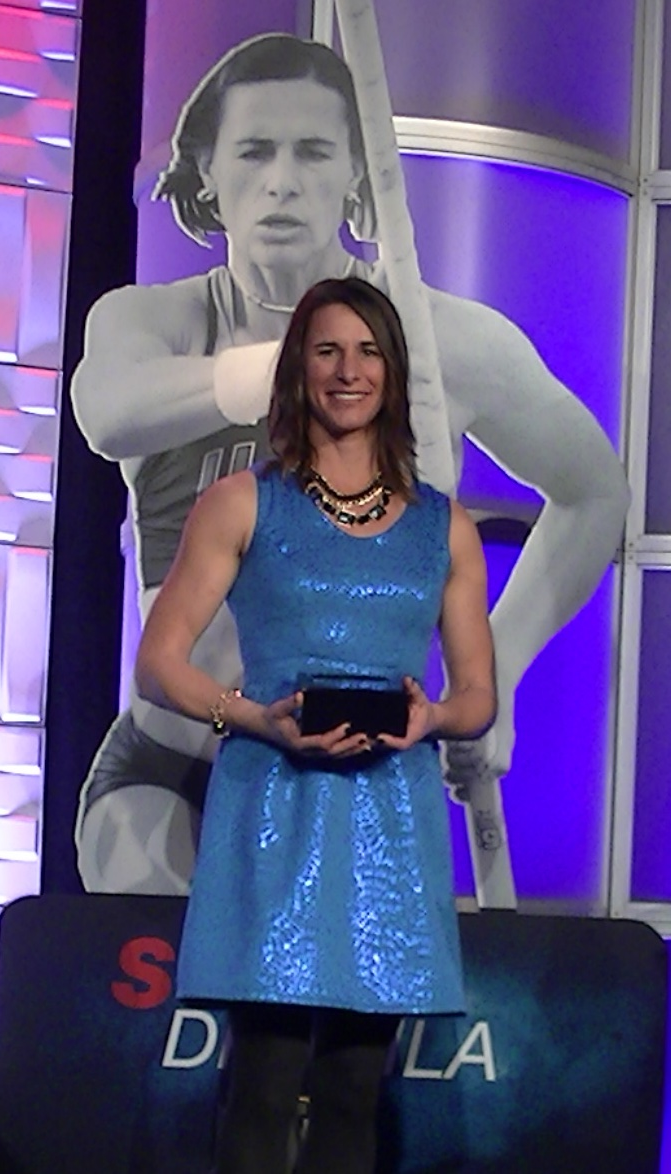
Stacy Dragila standing in front of her photographic statue while being inducted into the National Track and Field Hall of Fame

Dragila was born and raised in Auburn, California, northeast of Sacramento. She participated in gymnastics but gave it up due to childhood asthma.

She attended Placer High School where she played volleyball and competed on the track team as a sprinter, hurdler, and jumper. She was coached by Yuba Community College's John Orognen. She competed in the 300 meters hurdles at the CIF California State Meet, but did not place. In 1990, she placed second at the Golden West Invitational in the 400 meters hurdles.

She graduated from Idaho State University in 1995. At ISU, she competed in the heptathlon. She was introduced to pole vaulting by her coach, a former vaulter himself, and she participated in some of the earliest sanctioned women's pole vault competitions.

== Pole vaulting career ==
Dragila won the women's pole vault competition at the 1996 U.S. Olympic Trials. Women's pole vault was a demonstration event at the Trials, and it was not included in the program of the 1996 Olympics in Atlanta.

In March 1997, Dragila won the pole vault competition at the Indoor World Championships and set her first indoor world record, 4.48 m (14 ft 8 in). Later that month, she scored 6,999 points in a women's decathlon in Los Angeles, setting an early American record in the event.

At the 1999 Outdoor World Championships, she again won gold and set her first outdoor world record, 4.60 m (15 ft 1 in). Over the course of her career, she set or tied the indoor world record 8 times and the outdoor world record 10 times.

After winning the 2000 U.S. Olympic Trials and resetting the world record at 4.63 m (15 ft 2 in), Dragila won the first women's pole vault Olympic gold medal at the 2000 Olympic Games in Sydney.

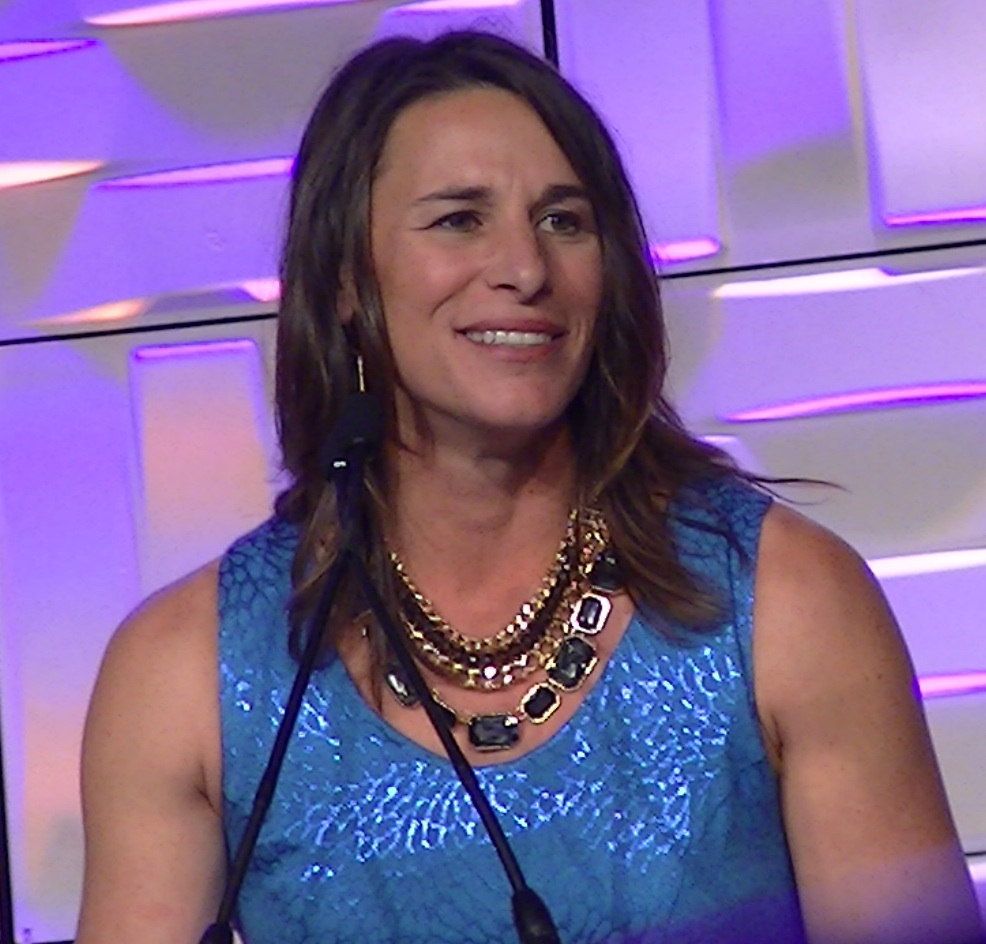
Stacy Dragila accepting her induction into the National Track and Field Hall of Fame

The World Championships in 2009 was Dragila's final major championship. She finished with a jump of 4.25 m (13 ft 11 1/2 in), not progressing to the pole vault final.

Although she jumped 4.70 m (15 ft 5 in) at age 37, her 4.55 m (14 ft 11 in) vault at age 38 in 2009 was the ratified W35 Masters World Record until 2017.

In 2014, she was elected to the National Track and Field Hall of Fame. A combined high school/collegiate indoor track and field invitational, the Stacy Dragila Open, is held annually at Idaho State University.

== International competitions ==
Year	Competition	Venue	Position	Notes
1997	World Indoor Championships	Paris, France	1st	Pole vault
1999	World Championships	Seville, Spain	1st	Pole vault
2000	Olympic Games	Sydney, Australia	1st	Pole vault
2001	World Championships	Edmonton, Alberta	1st	Pole vault
2001	Goodwill Games	Brisbane, Australia	1st	Pole vault
2003	World Athletics Final	Fontvieille, Monaco	1st	Pole vault
2004	World Indoor Championships	Budapest, Hungary	2nd	Pole vault

== National titles ==
- USA Outdoor Track and Field Championships
  - Pole vault (9): 1996^{†}, 1997, 1999, 2000, 2001, 2002, 2003, 2004, 2005
- USA Indoor Track and Field Championships
  - Pole vault (8): 1996, 1997, 1998, 1999, 2000, 2001, 2003, 2004

^{†} The 1996 contest was a non-championship event

== Personal ==
Stacy divorced Brent Dragila in 2006.

She lived in San Diego, California, and is the founder of Altius Track Club.

Stacy now lives in Boise, Idaho, where she owns and coaches at a premier indoor/outdoor pole vault facility, Dragila Vault Co.

She married American discus thrower Ian Waltz and welcomed daughter Allyx (an alternative spelling of the standard 'Alex') Josephine Waltz on June 21, 2010.

== Awards ==
- World Athletics Awards

World Athlete of the Year (Women)：2001

Records
Preceded by Emma George	Women's pole vault world record holder August 21, 1999 – July 13, 2003	Succeeded by Yelena Isinbayeva
Awards
Preceded by Marion Jones	Women's Track & Field Athlete of the Year; 2001	Succeeded by Paula Radcliffe
