= Stephanie McCann =

Canadian pole vaulter

Personal information
- Born: April 22, 1977 (age 49)
Medal record
Women's Athletics
Representing Canada
Commonwealth Games
| Bronze medal – third place | 2006 Melbourne | Pole Vault |
| Bronze medal – third place | 2002 Manchester | Pole Vault |
Pan American Games
| Bronze medal – third place | 2003 Santo Domingo | Pole Vault |

Stephanie Lynn McCann (born April 22, 1977 in Vancouver, British Columbia) is a Canadian pole vaulter.

She finished fifth at the 2001 Summer Universiade and tenth at the 2004 Summer Olympics. She won bronze medals at the 2002 Commonwealth Games, the 2003 Pan American Games and the 2006 Commonwealth Games. She also competed at the World Championships in 2001 and 2003 without reaching the final.

Her personal best jump is 4.41 metres, achieved in July 2003 in Atascadero.

McCann is now a qualified physiotherapist, acupuncturist and Stott Pilates instructor in Vancouver.
