= Sun Caiyun =

Chinese pole vaulter

Sun Caiyun (Chinese: 孙彩云; born July 21, 1973, in Shenzhen) is a Chinese former pole vaulter, who was one of the leading athletes in her discipline in the early 1990s. She became the first official world record holder, jumping 4.05 meters on May 21, 1992, in Nanjing, China. In 1994 she received a three-month doping ban.

== Competition record ==
Year	Competition	Venue	Position	Notes
Representing China
1994	Goodwill Games	St. Petersburg, Russia	1st	4.00 m
1997	World Indoor Championships	Paris, France	4th	4.20 m
1998	Goodwill Games	Uniondale, United States	8th	4.10 m
1998	Asian Games	Bangkok, Thailand	3rd	4.00 m
1999	World Indoor Championships	Maebashi, Japan	22nd	3.85 m

Records
Preceded by None; Daniela Bártová	Women's pole vault world record holder May 21, 1992–June 18, 1995; November 4–30, 1995	Succeeded by Daniela Bártová (Australia) Emma George
