= Julia (given name) =

Feminine given name

- Pronunciation: English: /ˈdʒuːliə/ JOO-lee-ə; Russian: [ˈjulʲɪjə]; Ukrainian: [ˈjul⁽ʲ⁾ijɐ]; Polish: [ˈjulja]; Hungarian: [ˈjuːliɒ]; Spanish: [ˈxulja]; Catalan: [ˈʒuli.ə]
- Gender: Feminine

Other gender
- Masculine: Julio, Julius, Julian, Julien

Origin
- Language: Latin
- Meaning: "of the gens Julia, a descendant of Julus"

Other names
- Related names: Julie, Iulia, Yulia, Juliana, Julianna, Jill, Jillian, Juliette, Giuliana

Julia is a feminine given name. It is a Latinate feminine form of the name Julio and Julius. (For further details on etymology, see the Wiktionary entry "Julius.") The given name Julia had been in use throughout Late Antiquity (e.g. Julia of Corsica) but became rare during the Middle Ages, and was revived only with the Italian Renaissance. It became common in the English-speaking world only in the 18th century. Today, it is frequently used throughout the world.

== Statistics ==
Julia was the thirtieth most popular name for girls born in the United States in 2007 and the 88th most popular name for women in the 1990 census there. It has been among the top 150 names given to girls in the United States for the past 100 years. It was the 89th most popular name for girls born in England and Wales in 2007; the 94th most popular name for girls born in Scotland in 2007; the 13th most popular name for girls born in Spain in 2006; the 5th most popular name for girls born in Sweden in 2007; the 94th most popular name for girls born in Belgium in 2006; the 53rd most popular name for girls born in Norway in 2007; the 70th most popular name for girls born in Hungary in 2005; the 39th most popular name for girls born in Canada in 2022; the 9th most popular name for girls born in Germany in 2005; the 2nd most popular name for girls born in Poland in 2013 and the most popular name in Austria.

The programming language Julia is one of the few that use a feminine name (the earliest one is likely Ada; others include Crystal). The language Julia is however not named after a specific woman, while Ada is named for the programmer pioneer Ada Lovelace.

== People ==
=== Ancient world ===
- Julia (women of the Julii Caesares):
  - Julia (wife of Sulla) (c. 129 BC–c. 104 BC), first wife of Sulla
  - Julia (wife of Marius) (c. 130 BC–69 BC)
  - Julia (mother of Mark Antony) (104 BC–after 39 BC)
  - Julia Major (sister of Julius Caesar) (before 101 BC–?)
  - Julia Minor (sister of Julius Caesar) (101 BC–51 BC), maternal grandmother of Emperor Augustus Caesar
  - Julia (daughter of Caesar) (c. 76 BC–54 BC)
  - Livia Drusilla (58 BC–29 AD), also known as Julia Augusta, wife of Emperor Augustus Caesar
  - Julia the Elder (39 BC–14 AD), daughter of Emperor Augustus
  - Julia Livia (before 14–43), granddaughter of Emperor Tiberius
  - Julia Agrippina or Agrippina the Younger (15–59), daughter of the general Germanicus and fourth wife of Emperor Claudius
  - Julia Drusilla (16–38), daughter of Germanicus, sister of Caligula
  - Julia Livilla (18-late AD 41 or early AD 42), daughter of Germanicus, youngest sister of Caligula
  - Julia Drusilla (39–41), daughter of Emperor Caligula
- Julia the Younger (actually Vipsania Julia, 19 BC–c. AD 29), daughter of Julia the Elder
- Berenice (daughter of Herod Agrippa) (28–after 81), Julia Berenice, princess of the Herodian Dynasty
- Julia Urania (fl. 1st century), wife of Roman client king Ptolemy of Mauretania
- Julia Procilla, mother of Gallo-Roman general Gnaeus Julius Agricola (40–93)
- Julia Iotapa (daughter of Antiochus III) (before 17–c. 52), Queen of Commagene
- Julia Iotapa (daughter of Antiochus IV) (c. 45–after 96), Queen of Cetis
- Julia Iotapa (Cilician princess) (c. 80–2nd century), Princess of Cilicia
- Julia Mamaea (wife of Polemon II of Pontus) (fl. 1st century), second wife of Polemon II of Pontus
- Julia (daughter of Tigranes VI of Armenia) (fl. 1st century-possibly 2nd century), Herodian Princess of Armenia
- Julia Agricola (64–?), daughter of general Gnaeus Julius Agricola and wife to historian Tacitus
- Julia Flavia (64–91), daughter of emperor Titus
- Julia Balbilla (72–after 130), poet and companion of Hadrian's wife Vibia Sabina
- Julia Tertulla (fl. 1st–2nd century), daughter of suffect consul Gaius Julius Cornutus Tertullus
- Julia Serviana Paulina (died before 136?), niece of Emperor Hadrian
- Julia Crispina, princess and granddaughter of Julia Berenice
- Julia Fadilla, younger half-sister to Emperor Antoninus Pius and paternal aunt to Empress Faustina the Younger
- Julia Domna (160–217), empress and wife of Emperor Septimius Severus
- Julia Maesa (c. 165–c. 224), Domna's sister
- Julia Soaemias (180–222), daughter to Julia Maesa and mother of emperor Elagabalus
- Julia Avita Mamaea (after 180–235), Soaemias' sister and mother of emperor Alexander Severus
- Julia Severa or Severina (fl. 3rd century), daughter of Emperor Philip the Arab
- One of the Martyrs of Zaragoza (died c. 303)
- Julia of Mérida (died 304), martyr
- Julia of Corsica (died on or after 439), virgin martyr

=== Modern world ===
- Julia Carter Aldrich (1834–1924), American author
- Julia McGehee Alexander (1876–1957), American politician and lawyer
- Júlia Almeida (born 1983), Brazilian actress
- Julia A. Ames (1816–1891), American journalist, editor and temperance reformer
- Julia Arthur (1869–1950), Canadian-born stage and film actress
- Julia Barretto (born 1997), Filipino actress
- Julia Bartz (writer), American writer
- Julia Bascom, 21st century American autism rights activist
- Julia Behrens (born 1990), German politician
- Julia Berwind (1865–1961), American socialite and social welfare activist
- Julia Bianchi
- Julie Billiart (1751–1816), French Catholic saint
- Julia Boutros (born 1968), Lebanese singer
- Julia Evangeline Brooks, incorporator of Alpha Kappa Alpha sorority
- Julia Budd (born 1983), Canadian martial artist
- Júlia Calvet (born 2001), Spanish politician
- Julia Campbell, multiple people
- Julia Abigail Fletcher Carney (1823–1908), American educator and poet
- Julia de Castro (born 2002), Brazilian politician
- Julia Child (1912–2004), American gourmet cook, author and television personality
- Julia Childs (1962), British playwright and director
- Julia Clarete (born 1979), Filipino singer and actress
- Julia Cohen (born 1989), American tennis player
- Julia Colman (1828–1909), American educator, activist, editor and writer
- Julia Pleasants Creswell (1827–1886), American poet and novelist
- Julia Curlee, American intelligence officer
- Julia Damasiewicz (born 2004), Polish kitesurfer
- Julia Davis (born 1966), English actress
- Julia Dean (actress, born 1830) (1830–1868), American stage actress
- Julia Dean (actress, born 1878) (1878–1952), American stage and film actress
- Julia Deans, New Zealand singer-songwriter
- Julia de Burgos (1914–1953), Puerto Rican poet
- Julia Dias (born 1959), British High Court judge
- Julia C. R. Dorr (1825–1913), American author
- Julia Dorsey (1850–1919), African-American suffragist
- Julia Ducournau (born 1983), French filmmaker
- Julia Duffy (born 1951), American actress
- Julia Duporty (born 1971), Cuban sprinter
- Julia Knowlton Dyer (1829–1927), American philanthropist
- Julia Eikeland (born 2000), Norwegian politician
- Julia Eisentraut (born 1993), German politician
- Julia Evelyn (1757–1797), English aristocrat and landowner
- Julia Shuckburgh-Evelyn (1790–1814), British aristocrat
- Julia Farkas (born 2005), Hungarian rhythmic gymnast
- Julia Figueredo (born 1966), Bolivian politician
- Julia Fiquet (born 2001), French singer known by the mononym Julia
- Julia Fischer (born 1983), German violinist
- Julia Wheelock Freeman (1833–1900), American Civil War nurse
- Julia Garner (born 1994), American actress
- Julia Gatley, architect, academic, architectural historian and author from New Zealand
- Julia Gillard (born 1961), Australian politician, Prime Minister
- Julia Glushko (born 1990), Israeli tennis player
- Julia Goddard (1825–1896), British children's writer and animal welfare campaigner
- Julia Gordon (mathematician), Canadian mathematician
- Julia Görges (born 1988), German tennis player
- Julia Gosling (born 2001), Canadian ice hockey player
- Julia Grabher (born 1996), Austrian tennis player
- Julia Grant (1826–1902), wife of US President Ulysses Grant
- Julia Grant (1954–2019), British transgender activist
- Julia Boynton Green (1861–1957), American poet
- Júlia Hajdú (1925–1987), Hungarian composer and pianist
- Julia Hamburg (born 1986), German politician
- Julia Kathrine Hansen (born 2003), Danish singer
- Julia Hanes (born 1995), Canadian para-athletics athlete
- Julia Harenz (born 1994), German politician
- Julia Haworth (born 1979), British actress
- Julia Hermosilla (1916–2009), Basque activist and resistance fighter
- Julia Hirschberg, American computer scientist
- Julia Ward Howe (1819–1910), American abolitionist, social activist and poet
- Julia Hütter (born 1983), German pole-vaulter
- Julia Imene-Chanduru (born 1979), Namibian diplomat
- Julia Goodrich Roswell-Smith Inness (1853–1941), American clubwoman
- Julia Ioffe (born 1982), Russian-born American journalist
- Julia Irwin (born 1951), Australian politician
- Julia Karlernäs (born 1993), Swedish footballer
- Julia Kinberg (1874–1945), Swedish physician and feminist
- Julia Klöckner (born 1972), German politician
- Julia Kurunczi (born 2006), Brazilian rhythmic gymnast
- Julia Kwan, Canadian screenwriter and director
- Julia Lathrop (1858–1932), American social reformer
- Julia Ledóchowska, birth name of Ursula Ledóchowska (1865–1939), Roman Catholic saint
- Julia Lennon (1914–1958), mother of John Lennon
- Julia Letlow (born 1981), American politician and academic administrator
- Julia Lipnitskaya (born 1998), Russian figure skater
- Julia Louis-Dreyfus (born 1961), American actress, co-star of the TV series Seinfeld
- Julia López (disambiguation) (various people)
- Julia Majchrzak (born 2000), Polish television personality
- Julia Mancuso (born 1984), American skier
- Julia Marden, Wampanoag artist
- Julia Marlowe (1865–1950), English-born American actress
- Julia Harris May (1833–1912), American poet, teacher and school founder
- Julia McCabe, American politician
- Julia E. McConaughy (1834–1885), American litterateur and author
- Julia Menéndez (born 1985), Spanish field hockey defender
- Julia Michaels (born 1993), American singer and songwriter
- Julia Mierzyńska (1801–1831), Polish prima ballerina, choreographer
- Julia Molin (born 1990), Swedish footballer
- Julia Montes (born 1995), Filipino-German actress
- Julia A. Moore (1847–1920), American poet
- Julia Hartley Moore, New Zealand private investigator and author
- Julia Morgan (1872–1957), American architect
- Julia Morton (1912–1996), American author and botanist
- Julia Muir (born 1970), Zimbabwean tennis player
- Julia Murney (born 1969), American actress and singer
- Julia Nesheiwat, Arab-American US Army soldier and advisor
- Julia Newmeyer (born 1933), American actress better known as Julie Newmar
- Julia Nyberg (1784–1854), Swedish poet
- Julia Ormond (born 1965), British actress
- Julia Anna Orum (1843–1904), American educator, lecturer, and author
- Julia Perez (1980–2017), Indonesian actress, singer, presenter, model and comedian
- Julia Pérez Montes de Oca (1839–1875), Cuban poet
- Julia Phillips (1944–2002), American film producer and author
- Julia Piera (born 1970), Spanish poet
- Julia Preston (born 1951), American journalist
- Julia Carter Preston (1926–2012), British artist
- Julia Jones Pugliese (1909–1993), American fencer and fencing coach
- Julia Rais (born 1971), Malaysian film actress and princess
- Julia Rayner, British actress
- Julia Reynolds, American journalist
- Julia Riew, American composer and songwriter
- Julia Roberts (born 1967), American actress
- Julia Romero Gusse, American politician
- Julia Sakara (born 1969), Zimbabwean middle-distance runner
- Julia Sanderson (1888–1975), American actress and singer
- Julia Sanina (born 1990), Ukrainian singer and the front woman of the Ukrainian alternative rock band The Hardkiss
- Julia Sawalha (born 1968), British actress
- Julia Schalin (born 2005), Finnish ice hockey player
- Julia Schruff (born 1982), German retired tennis player
- Julia H. Scott (1809–1842), American poet
- Julia Ralph Scott (born 1982), Scottish footballer
- Julia Sebutinde (born 1954), Ugandan jurist on the International Court of Justice
- Julia Rice Seney (1853–1915), American writer, newspaper editor, government administrator, and charity worker
- Julia Seton (1862–1950), American physician, lecturer and author
- Julia Spetsmark (born 1989), Swedish footballer
- Julia Stierli (born 1997), Swiss footballer
- Julia Stiles (born 1981), American actress
- Julia Stusek (born 2008), German tennis player
- Julia Sude (born 1987), German beach volleyball player
- Julia Swayne Gordon (1878–1933), American actress
- Julia Sweeney (born 1959), American actor and comedian
- Julia Szeremeta (born 2003), Polish boxer
- Julia Szczurowska (born 2001), Polish volleyball player
- Julia Vakulenko (born 1983), Ukrainian tennis player
- Julia Rush Cutler Ward (1796–1824), American poet
- Julia Watson (born 1953), British actress
- Julia Watson (born 1977), Australian-born landscape designer
- Julia Watson (fl. 2026), American literary scholar
- Julia Wells (born 1935), English actress, singer and author better known as Julie Andrews
- Julia Whitworth, American priest
- Julia Wilson (born 1978), Australian rower
- Julia Winter (born 1993), Swedish-British actress
- Julia A. Wood (1840–1927), American writer and composer
- Julia Amanda Sargent Wood (pen name, Minnie Mary Lee; 1825–1903), American author
- Julia McNair Wright (1840–1903), American writer
- Julia Wyszyńska (born 1986), Polish actress
- Julia Evelyn Ditto Young (1857–1915), American novelist and poet

== Fictional characters ==
- Julia (Nineteen Eighty-Four), a character in Nineteen Eighty-Four by George Orwell
- Julia (Rave Master), a character in manga series Rave Master
- Julia (Sesame Street), a character with autism in the children's television series Sesame Street
- Julia, a character in The Ragwitch by Garth Nix
- Julia, a character in William Shakespeare's play Two Gentlemen of Verona
- Julia, a character in the anime series Cowboy Bebop
- Julia Argent, a character from the Netflix series, Carmen Sandiego (TV series)
- Julia Baker, a character from the 1960s television series, Julia (1968 TV series)
- Julia Chang, character in the Tekken video game series
- Julia "Jules" Cobb, a character played by Courteney Cox on the comedy series Cougar Town
- Julia Crichton, the female protagonist in Fullmetal Alchemist: The Sacred Star of Milos
- Donna Julia, a character in the poem "Don Juan" by Lord Byron
- Julia Fernandez, a character from the manga and anime Beyblade G-Revolutions
- Julie "Finn" Finlay, a character played by Elisabeth Shue in CSI: Crime Scene Investigation
- Julia Flyte, a character in Brideshead Revisited by Evelyn Waugh
- Julia Goodway, a character in the 2013 animated series Paw Patrol (originally named Justina Goodway)
- Julia Graham, a character in the 2010 adaptation of Parenthood
- Julia Houston, a character played by Debra Messing on the TV series Smash
- Julia McNamara, a character on the U.S. television series Nip/Tuck
- Julia Millstein, a Season 1 contestant in Fetch! with Ruff Ruffman
- Julia Ogden, a character in the Canadian television series Murdoch Mysteries
- Julia Sugarbaker, a character in the sitcom Designing Women
- Julia Feingold, minor character from the novel serie «The Trials of Apollo» by Rick Riordan.
- Julia, the main antagonist of Total Drama the reboot
- Julia, a minor character in The Duchess of Malfi

== List of variants ==
- Džūlija, Jūlija (Latvian)
- Ghjulia (Corsican)
- Gillian (English)
- Giulia (Italian)
- Giuliana (Italian)
- Giulietta (Italian)
- Ίουλα, Íoula, Íula (Greek)
- Ιουλία, Ioulía, Iulía (Greek)
- Ιουλιέττα or Ιουλιέτα, Ioulietta/Ioulieta, Iulietta/Iulieta (Greek)
- Iuliana, Iouliana (Ιουλιάνα) (Greek)
- Iulianna, Ioulianna (Ιουλιάννα) (Greek)
- Iúile (Irish)
- Iulia (Bulgarian, Hawaiian, Romanian and Latin)
- Iuliana (Romanian)
- Iuliia, Iuliya (Юлія) (Ukrainian)
- Jill (English)
- Jillian (English)
- Jovita (Spanish)
- Jules (English)
- Juli (Hungarian)
- Júlia (Catalan, Hungarian, Portuguese, Slovak)
- Júlía (Icelandic)
- Juliana (Dutch, English, German, Portuguese, Spanish)
- Juliane (French, German)
- Julianna (English, Hungarian, Polish)
- Julianne (English)
- Juliana, Julia, Yulia (Indonesian)
- Julie (Czech, Danish, English, French, Norwegian)
- Julienne (French)
- Julienna (French)
- Juliet (English)
- Julia (Portuguese, Spanish)
- Julieta, Julietta (Spanish)
- Juliette (French)
- Julija (Lithuanian, Serbo-Croatian, Macedonian, Slovene)
- Jūlija (Latvian)
- Julijana (Slovene)
- Julinka (Hungarian)
- Juliska (Hungarian)
- Julcia, Julka, Julia (Polish)
- Julitta (Dutch)
- Juulia (Estonian, Finnish)
- Uliana (Ульяна) (Russian)
- Uliana, Uliyana (Уляна) (Ukrainian)
- Xhulia (Albanian)
- Xhuliana (Albanian)
- Xulia (Galician)
- Xiana (Galician)
- Xianna (Galician)
- Yulia (Юлия) (Russian)
- Yuliana (Bulgarian, Russian)
- Yuliya (Bulgarian, Russian)
- Julija (Macedonian)

== See also ==
- Julian
- Julie (given name)
- Juliet (disambiguation)
- Julija, given name
- Yulia, given name
- Yuliya, given name
