= Calvet =

Calvet is a Catalan surname. Notable people with the surname include:

== People ==
- Corinne Calvet (1925–2001), French actress
- Damià Calvet (born 1968), Catalan politician
- Esprit Calvet (1728–1810), French physician and collector
- Francisco Calvet (1921–2001), Catalan football player
- François Calvet (born 1953), French politician for Pyrénées-Orientales
- Gérard Calvet (1927–2008), French abbot
- Jean Marc Calvet (born 1965), French artist
- Joseph Calvet (1897–1984), French classical violinist
- Júlia Calvet (born 2001), Spanish politician
- Laurent-Emmanuel Calvet (born 1969), French economist
- Louis-Jean Calvet (1942–2025), French linguist and academic
- Michel-Marie Calvet (born 1944), French-born New Caledonian archbishop
- Nuria Calvet (born 1950), Venezuelan astronomer
- Pierre du Calvet (1735–1786), Canadian businessman
- Pol Calvet (born 1994), Catalan football player
- Raphaël Calvet (born 1994), French football player
- Raul Donazar Calvet (1938–2008), Brazilian football player

== Other uses ==
- Casa Calvet, Barcelona, Spain
- Fondation Calvet, French art foundation

== See also ==
- Calvert (name)
