= Yulia =

- Gender: Female

Origin
- Language: Latin

Yulia is a female given name, the equivalent of the Latin Julia. It can be spelled Yulia, Yulya, Julia, Julja, Julija, Yuliia, Yuliya, Juliya or İulia. An alternative spelling is Ioulia/Gioulia (Greek) or Iuliia. Prononciations can differ, depending on where you are from. The name can be found in many countries, especially in ones with Christian majorities. (example: Italy, Germany, Greece, Spain, Ukraine, Bulgaria, Belarus, Russia etc.). A few notable people from some of the countries in which the name exist are shown below.

== People ==
=== Yulia ===
- Yulia Barsukova (born 1978), Russian rhythmic gymnast
- Yulia Beygelzimer (born 1983), Ukrainian tennis player
- Yulia Efimova (born 1992), Russian swimmer
- Yulia Fedossova (born 1988), French tennis player born in Novosibirsk, Russia
- Yulia Glushko (born 1990), Israeli tennis player
- Yulia Latynina (born 1966), Russian writer and journalist
- Yulia Livinskaya (born 1990), Russian freestyle skier
- Yulia Lipnitskaya (born 1998), Russian figure skater
- Yulia MacLean (stage name Yulia, born 1986), New Zealand singer
- Yulia Nachalova (1981–2019), Soviet and Russian singer, actress and television presenter
- Yulia Paevska (born 1968), Ukrainian paramedic
- Yulia Putintseva (born 1995), Russian-born Kazakhstani tennis player
- Yulia Raskina (born 1982), Belarusian rhythmic gymnast
- Yulia Sachkov (born 1999), Israeli world champion kickboxer
- Yulia Savicheva (born 1987), Russian singer
- Yulia Shevchuk (born 1998), Ukrainian footballer
- Yulia Sister (born 1936), Israeli chemist
- Yulia Tolopa (born 1995), Russian-born Ukrainian soldier
- Yulia Tymoshenko (born 1960), former Prime Minister of Ukraine.
- Yulia Volkova (born 1985), ex member of the Russian pop group t.A.T.u.
- Yulia Zagoruychenko (born 1981), Russian-American latin dancer
- Yulia Zivert a.k.a. Zivert (born 1990), Russian singer

=== Yuliya ===
Cyrillic: Юлія

- Yuliya Andriychuk (born 1992), Ukrainian handball player
- Yuliya Antipova (born 1966), Soviet luger
- Yuliya Baraley (born 1990), Ukrainian sprinter
- Yuliya Barysik (born 1984), Belarusian judoka
- Yuliya Beygelzimer (born 1983); Ukrainian tennis player
- Yuliya Bichyk (born 1983), Belarusian rower
- Yuliya Biryukova (born 1985), Russian foil fencer
- Yuliya Blahinya (born 1990), Ukrainian wrestler
- Yuliya Borisova (1925–2023), Soviet Russian actress
- Yuliya Chekaleva (born 1984), Russian cross-country skier
- Yuliya Chepalova (born 1976), Russian cross-country skier
- Yuliya Chermoshanskaya (born 1986), Russian track and field athlete
- Yuliya Dovhal (born 1983), Ukrainian weightlifter
- Yuliya Drishlyuk (born 1975), Kazakh sports shooter
- Yuliya Fomenko (runner) (born 1979), Russian middle-distance runner
- Yuliya Fomenko (swimmer) (born 1981), Russian backstroke swimmer
- Yuliya Gavrilova (born 1989), Russian sabre fencer
- Yuliya Gippenreyter (born 1930), Russian psychologist
- Yuliya Golubchikova (born 1983), Russian pole vaulter
- Yuliya Graudyn (born 1970), Russian hurdler
- Yuliya Gushchina (born 1983), Russian sprinter
- Yuliya Kalina (born 1988), Ukrainian weightlifter
- Yuliya Khitraya (born 1989), Belarusian swimmer
- Yuliya Kondakova (born 1981), Russian hurdler
- Yuliya Kosenkova (born 1973), Russian middle-distance runner
- Yuliya Krevsun (born 1980), Ukrainian middle-distance runner
- Yuliya Leantsiuk (born 1984), Belarusian shot putter
- Yuliya Levina (born 1973), Russian rower
- Yuliya Liteykina (born 1977), Russian speed skater
- Yuliya Lyakhova (born 1977), Russian high jumper
- Yuliya Maltseva (born 1990), Russian disc thrower
- Yuliya Martisova (born 1976), Russian road cyclist
- Yuliya Mayarchuk, Ukrainian-born actress
- Yuliya Olishevska (born 1989), Ukrainian athlete
- Yuliya Pakhalina, Russian diver
- Yuliya Pechonkina (born 1978); Russian athlete
- Yuliya Pidlisna (born 1987), Ukrainian swimmer
- Yuliya Platonova (1841–1892), Russian operatic soprano
- Yuliya Rakhmanova (born 1991), Kazakh sprinter
- Yuliya Pidluzhnaya (born 1988), Russian long jumper
- Yuliya Ratkevich (born 1985), Belarus-Azerbaijani wrestler
- Yuliya Saltsevich (born 1967), Russian volleyball player and coach
- Yuliya Shamshurina (born 1962), Soviet cross-country skier
- Yuliya Skokova (born 1982), Russian speed skater
- Yuliya Snigir (born 1983), Russian actress and model
- Yuliya Snopova (born 1985), Ukrainian handball player
- Yuliya Solntseva (1901–1989), Soviet film director and actress
- Yuliya Sotnikova (born 1970), Russian sprinter
- Yuliya Tabakova (born 1980), Russian sprinter
- Yuliya Tarasenko (gymnast) (born 1985), Belarusian gymnast
- Yuliya Tarasenko (orienteer) (born 1984), Russian ski orienteering competitor
- Yuliya Tarasova (born 1986), Uzbek heptathlete and long jumper
- Yuliya Tkach (born 1989), Ukrainian freestyle wrestler
- Yuliya Trushkina (born 2002), Belarusian canoeist
- Yuliya Vetlova (born 1983), Russian luger
- Yuliya Veysberg (1880–1942), Russian music critic and composer
- Yuliya Voyevodina (born 1971), Russian race walker
- Yuliya Yefimova (born 1992), Russian swimmer
- Yuliya Yelistratova (born 1988), Ukrainian triathlete
- Yuliya Zaripova (born 1989), Russian middle-distance athlete
- Yuliya Zhivitsa (born 1990), Kazakh sabre fencer

== Fictional characters ==
- Yulia (Night Watch), a young sorceress in the Night Watch books

== See also ==
- Julia, given name
- Julija, given name
- Iulia (disambiguation), including the given name
- Yuria (given name), a similarly-sounding Japanese feminine given name
