= Lapidary Museum (Avignon) =

Coordinates: 43.9459°N 4.8060°E

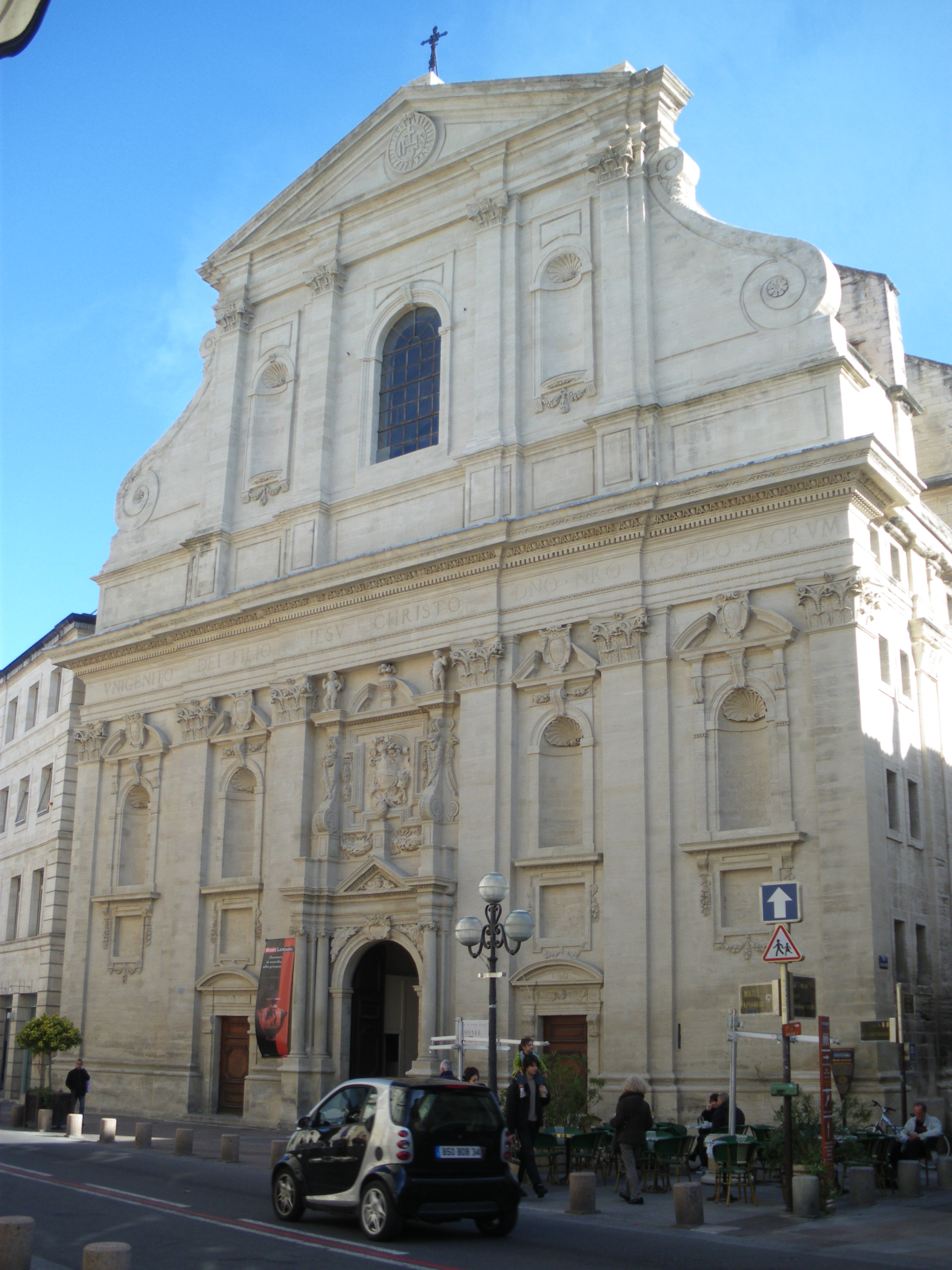

- Location within Vaucluse
- Location: Avignon, France
- Type: Archaeological museum
- Website: www.musee-lapidaire.org

The Lapidary Museum is a lapidarium-museum in Avignon, France. It has housed the classical Greek, Etruscan, Roman and Gallo-Roman sculptures and objects of the Calvet Museum since the 1980s. They are both run by the Fondation Calvet. As well as exhibiting the museum's core collections, it also mounts summer temporary exhibitions (e.g. "La diffusion des cultes égyptiens et alexandrins dans le monde romain à L'Égypte copte et l'Égypte musulmane" and "Le laraire d'Esprit Calvet"), conferences and networking events, particularly for scholars.

The museum is based at 27 rue de la République in a 17th-century building, previously the chapel of the city's Jesuit College. It was begun in 1616, initially to plans by Étienne Martelange and then by François de Royers de la Valfenière from 1620 onwards. de la Valfenière raised the walls as far as the nave's main cornice. The building was made a monument historique on 21 June 1928.

== Collections ==
As well as Etruria, classical Greece and Rome and the Gallo-Roman era, the collections cover Gallic and Early Christian art. The highlight of the prehistoric collections is the 'Lauris-Puyvert Stela' in ologenic limestone. The Greek, Roman, Etruscan and Gallic objects include vases and lamps as well as bas-reliefs and statues, along with a number of Etruscan funerary monuments.

=== Statues ===
- Apollo Sauroctonus, head lost, 1st century AD
- Woman in a chlamys and chiton, head lost, 2nd century BC
- Athena in a peplos, the skin of the goat Amalthea, the Gorgoneion and a plumed Corinthian helmet decorated with rams' heads
Statues grecques

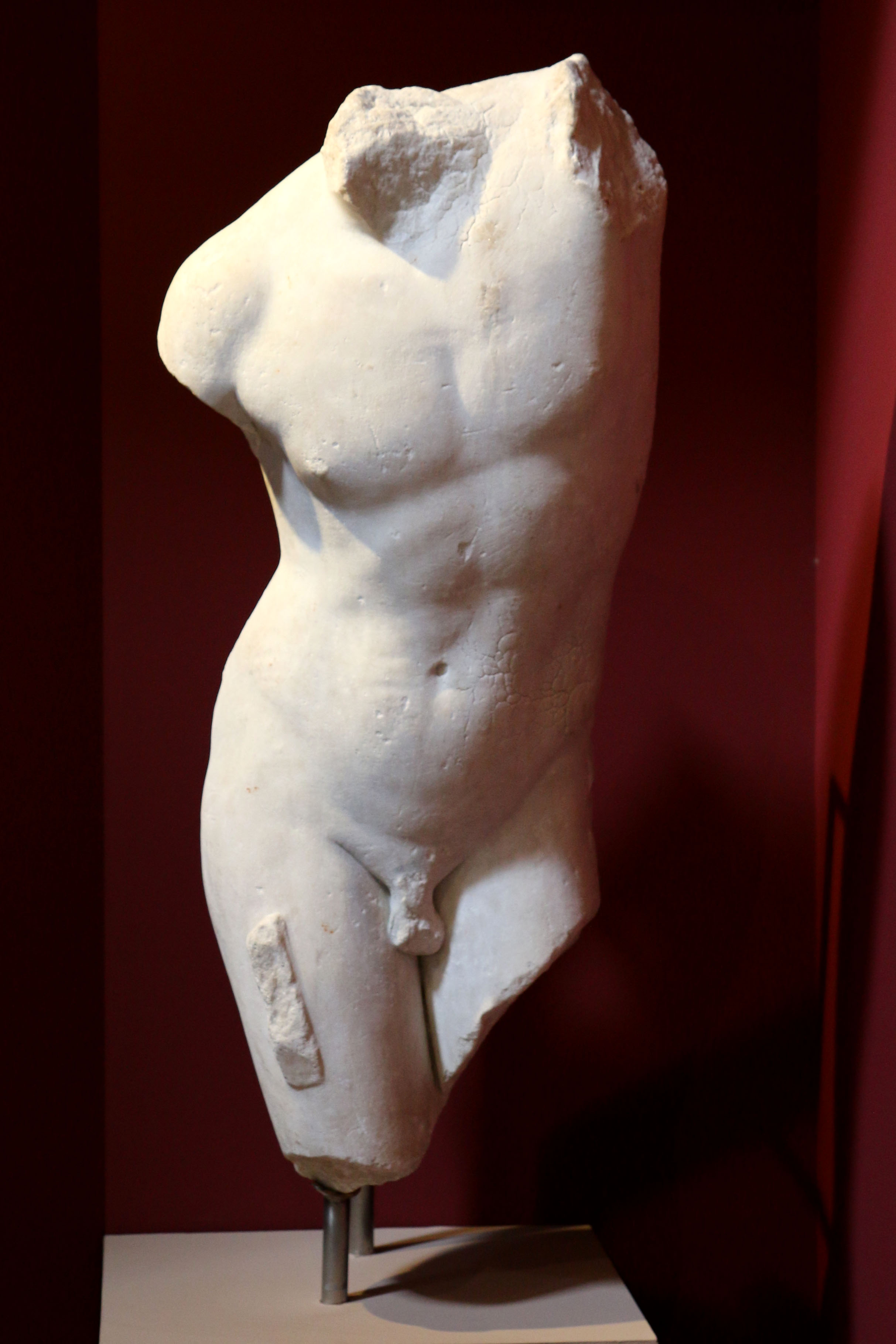
Apollo

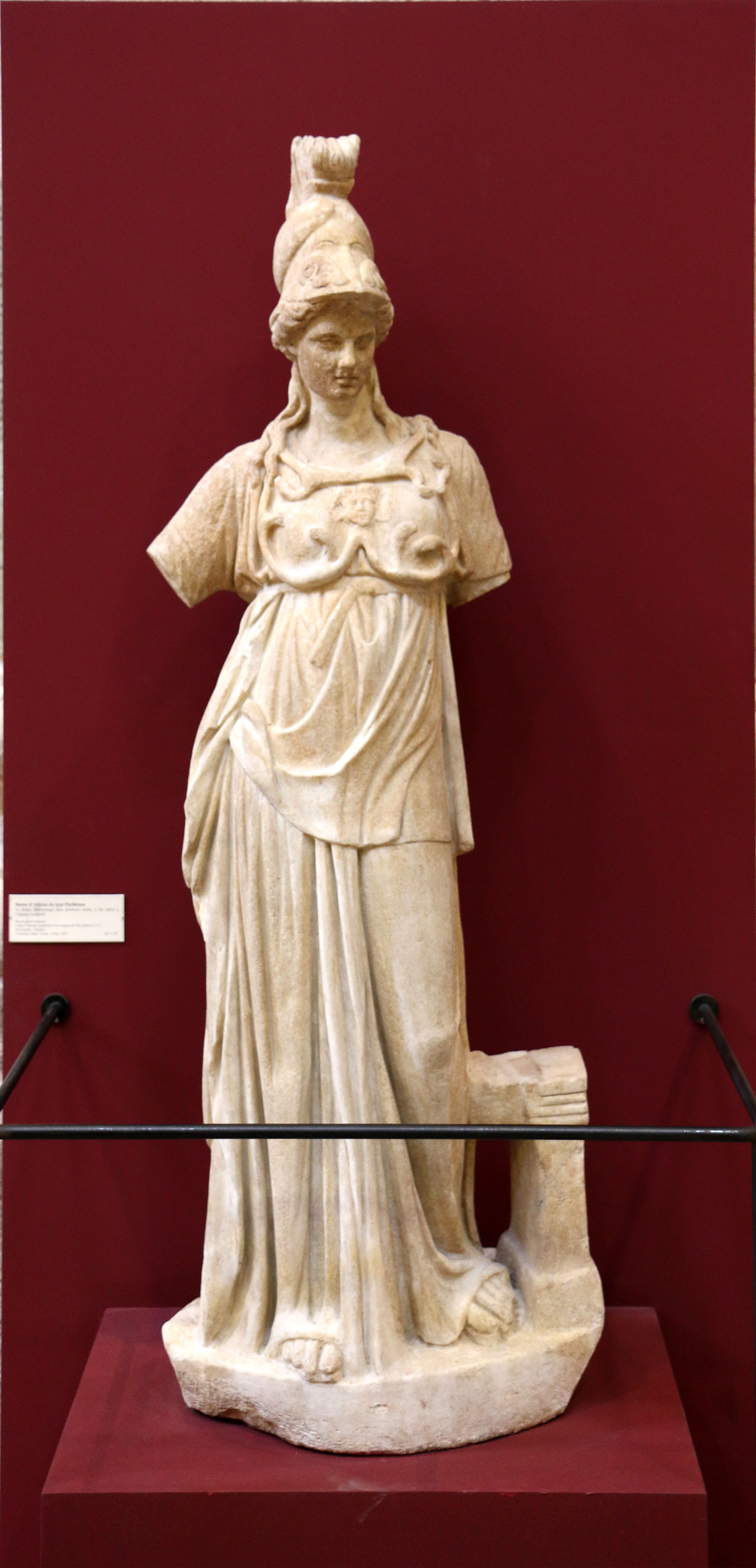
Athena

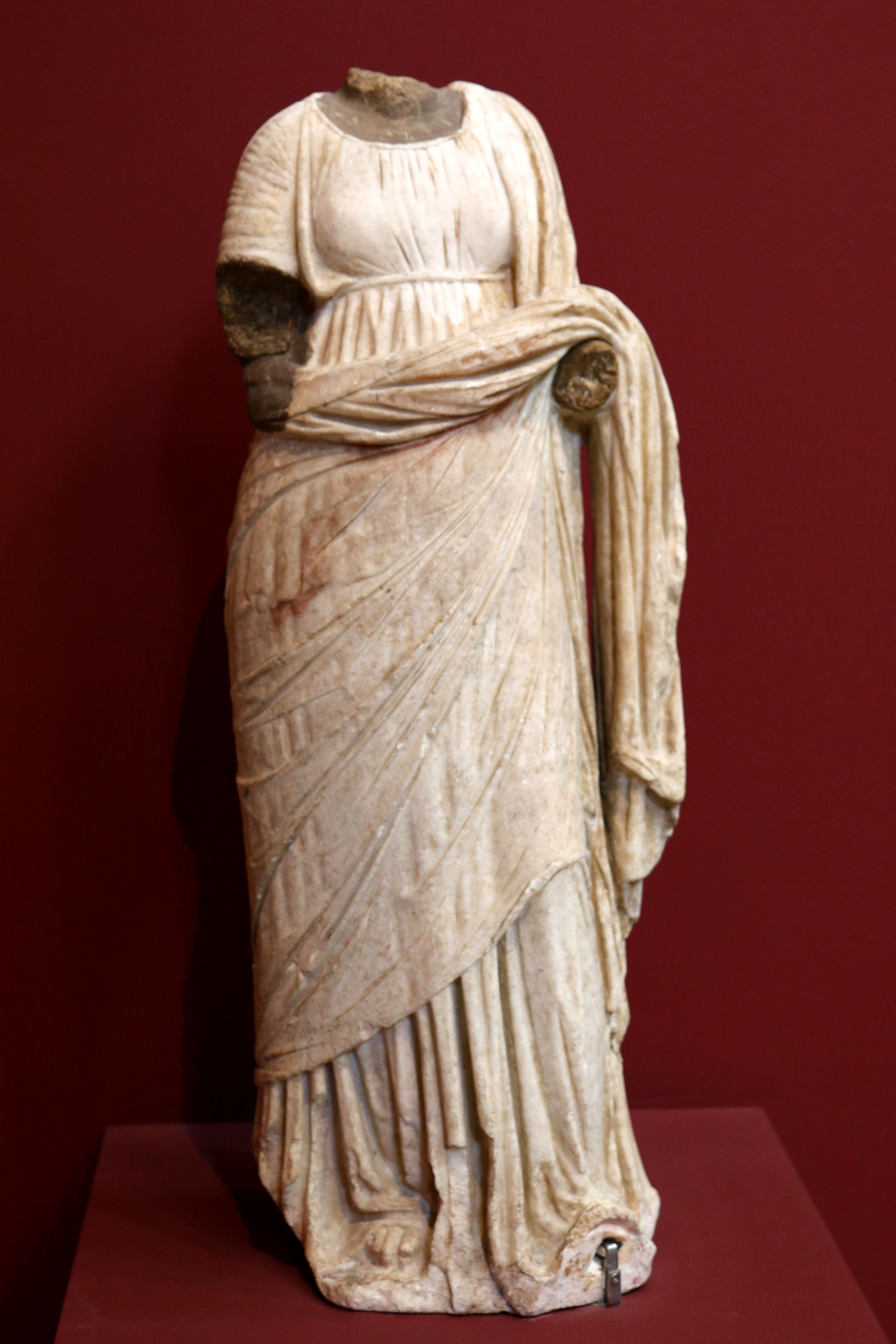
Woman

==== Steles ====
- Stela of a young woman in a tunic and mantle between two Doric columns, with a female slave presenting her with a duck, marble, Attican, 399-375 BC
- Young woman in a tunic and peplos holding her hand to her hair - Attican, 399-375 BC
- Stela of Menodotos - Woman in a chiton and himation sitting on a stool beside a standing man, all between two Corinthian columns and a triangular pediment
- Stela of Glykon and his son Tateis - upper register showing Hecate in her triple form with Demeter to the right, Men to the left and a crescent moon in the background; lower register showing the busts of a woman and a boy - 4th century BC
- Stela - seated woman with her feet on a stool holding an oblong object (possibly an egg or fruit) out to a snake, with a female slave to the left ina long tunic and handing another object to her mistress - Cyclades, 1st or 2nd century BC
Steles

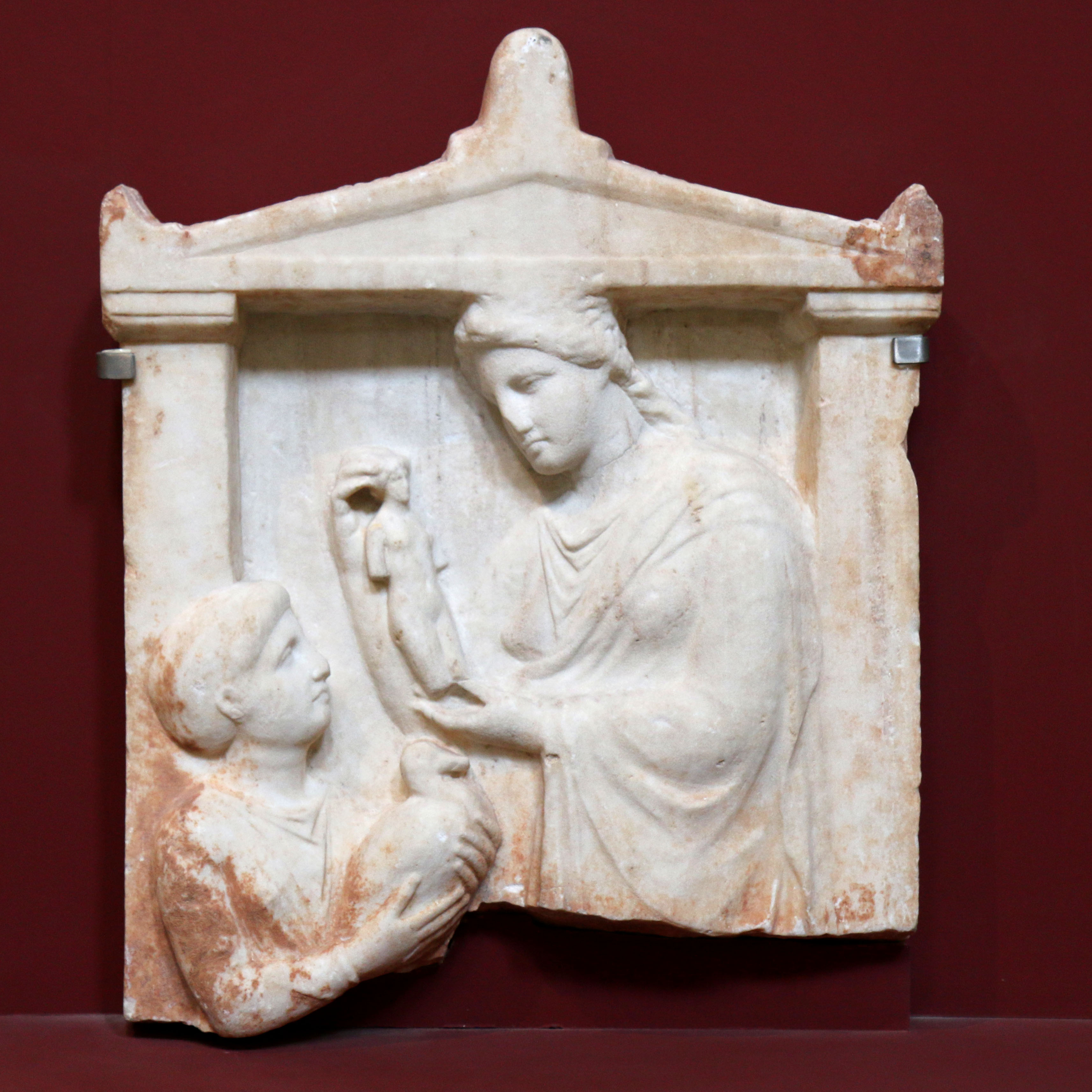
Young woman

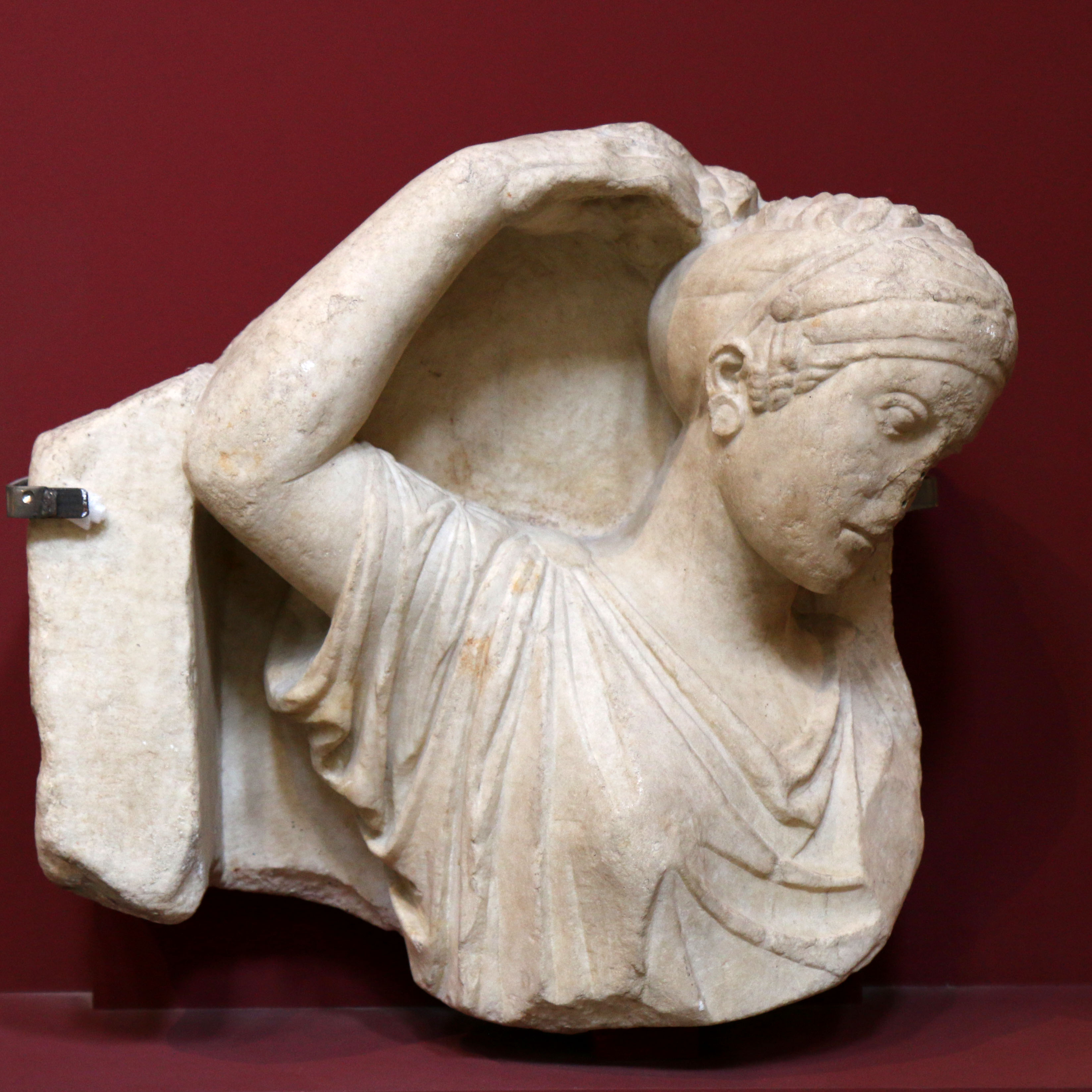
Young woman with her hand on her hair

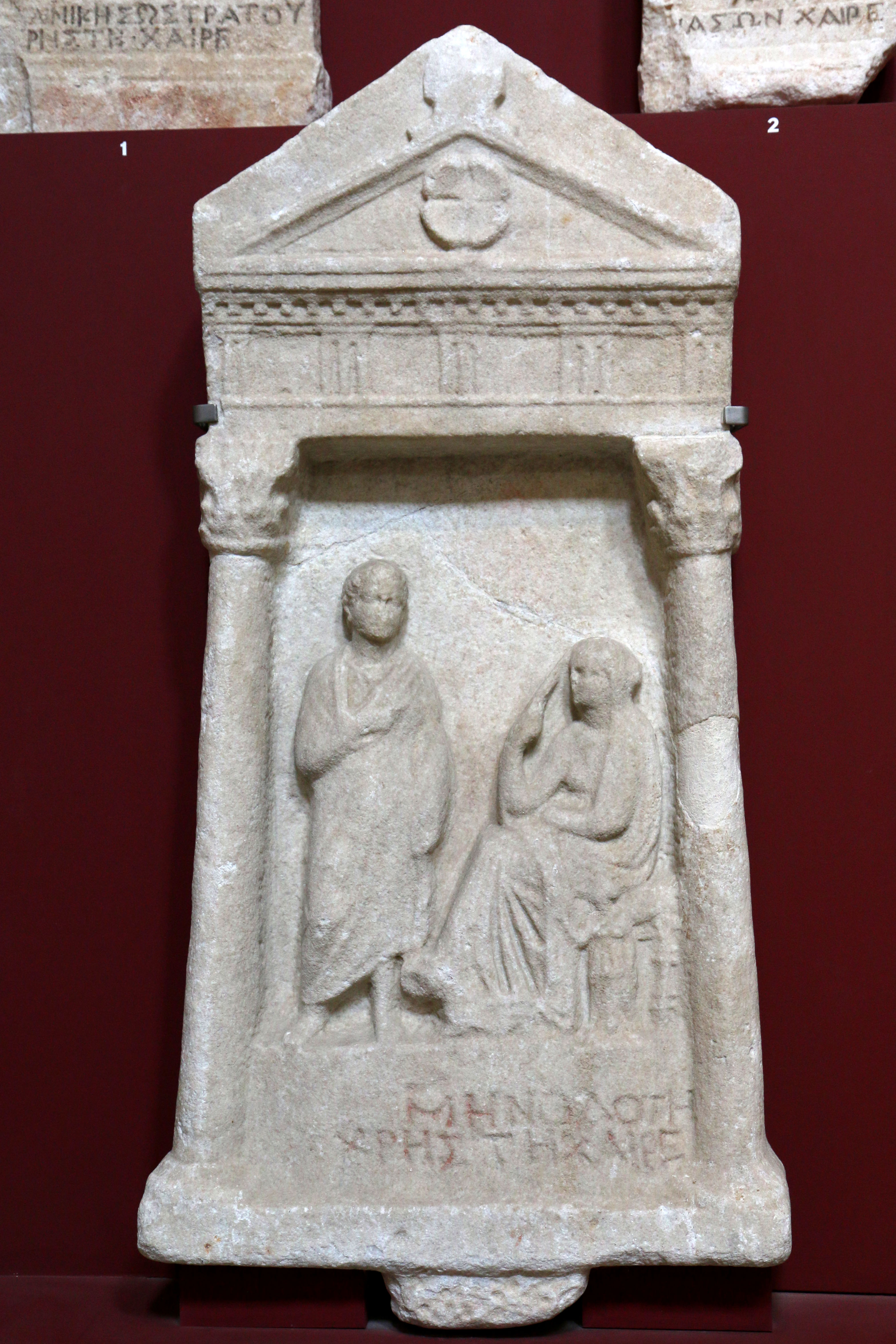
Stela of Menodotus

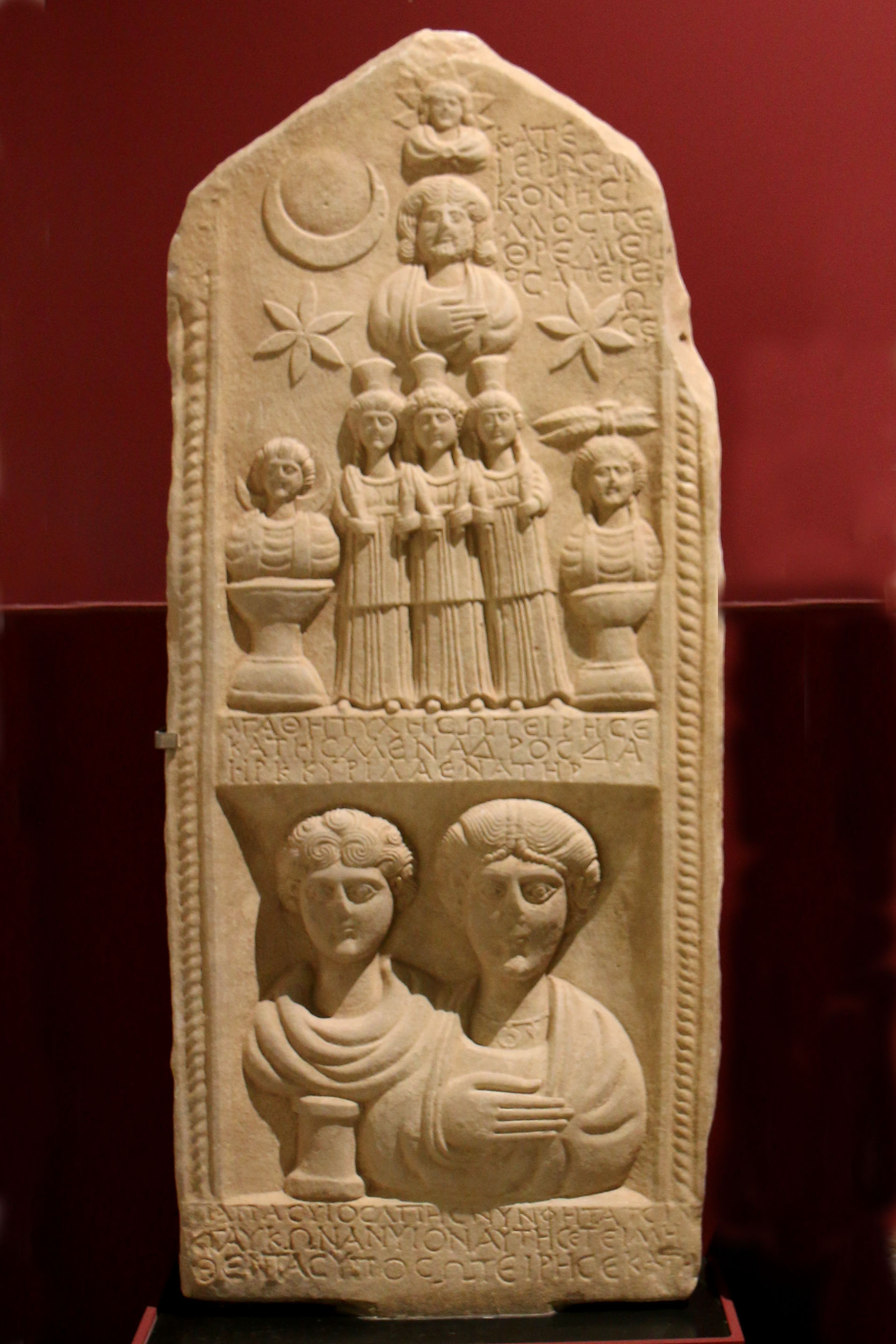
Stela of Glykon and his son Tateis

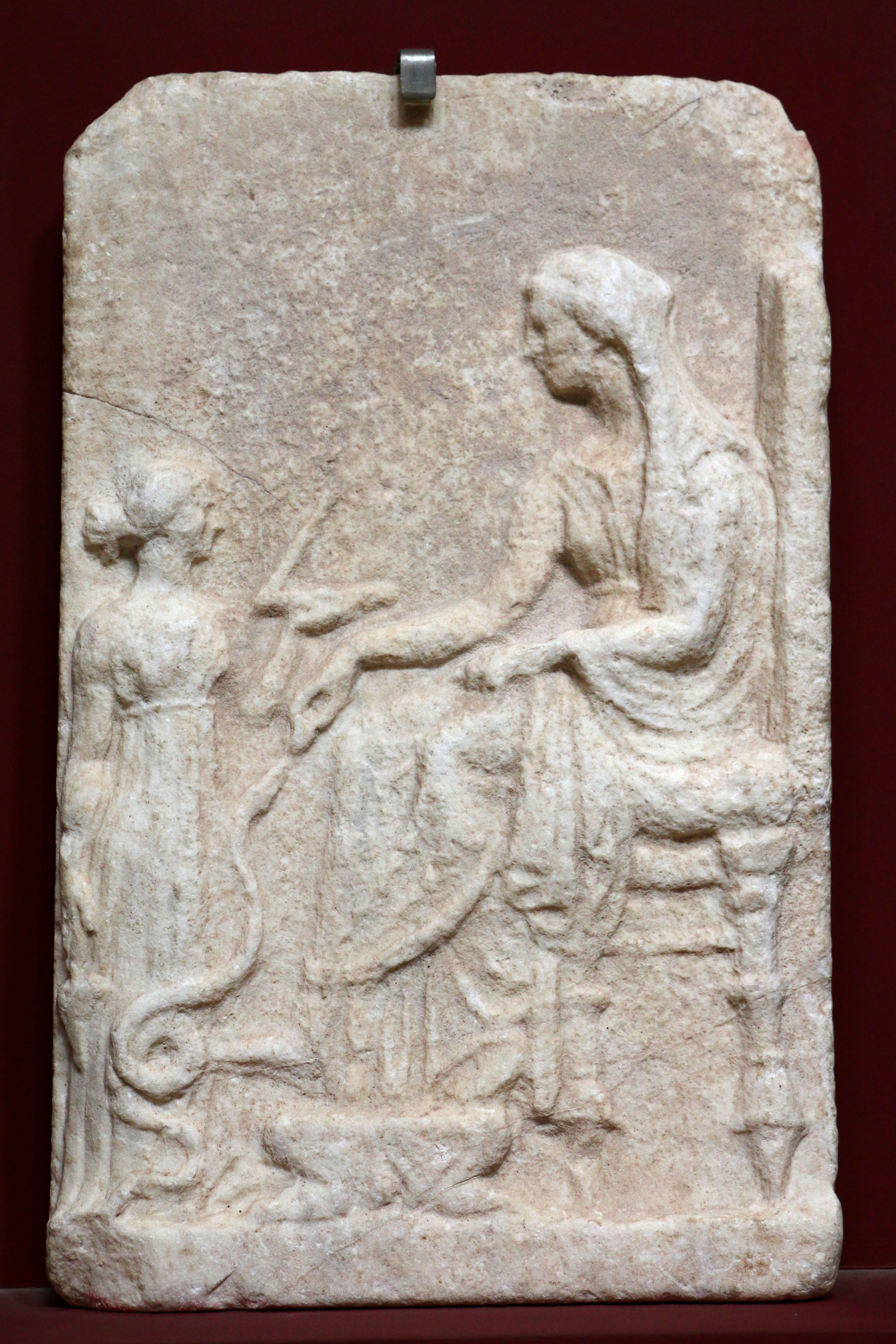
Stela without an inscription

=== Roman sculptures ===
- Veiled woman holding a patera in her right hand, possibly a priestess or goddess
- Woman with a dolphin, head lost
- Funerary urn, marble, with an epitaph to C. Silius Herma and his slave
- Funerary urn, rectangular, marble, with an epitaph to Marcus Domitius Urbicus
- Man's head
- Two-headed Hermes
Roman

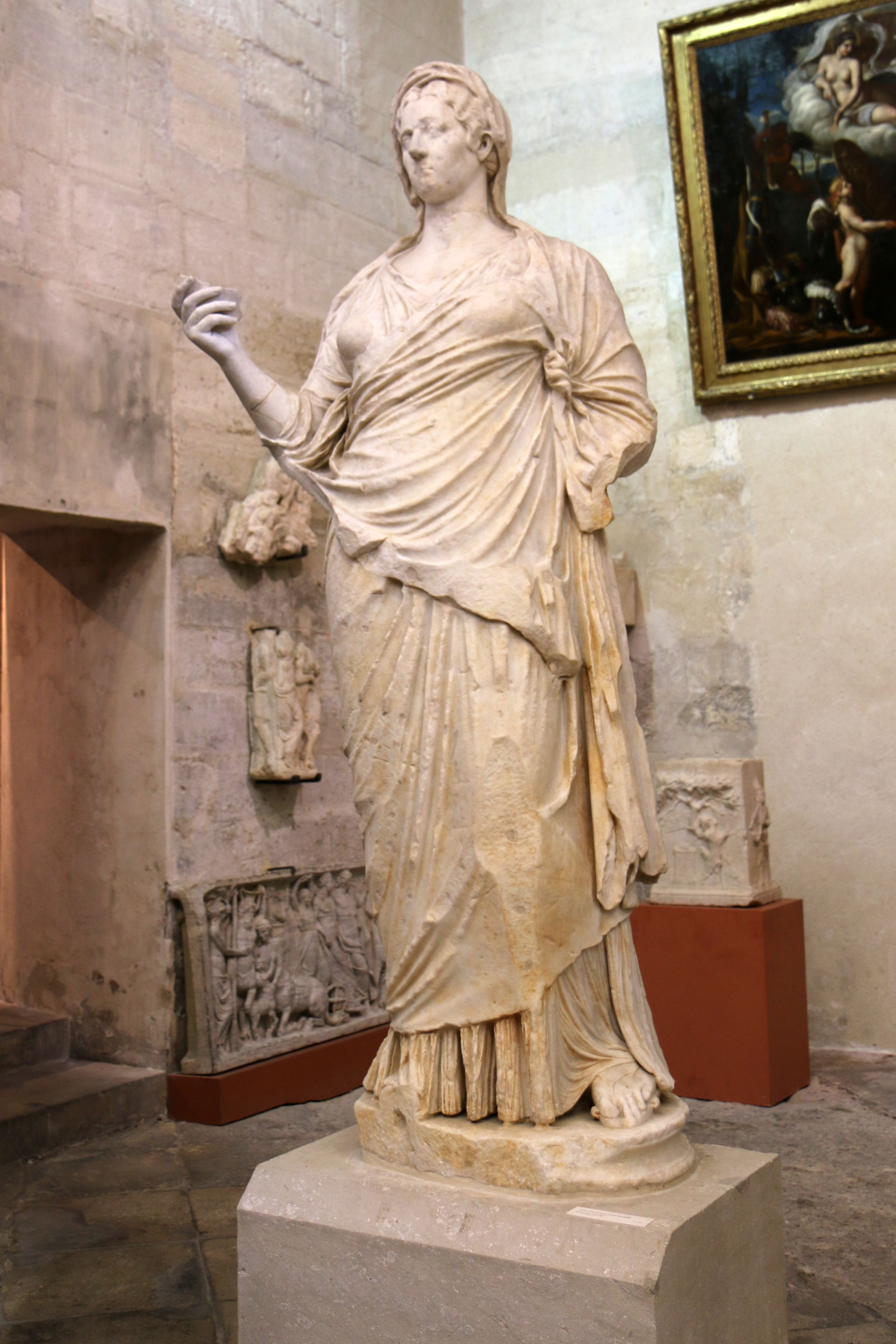
Veiled woman

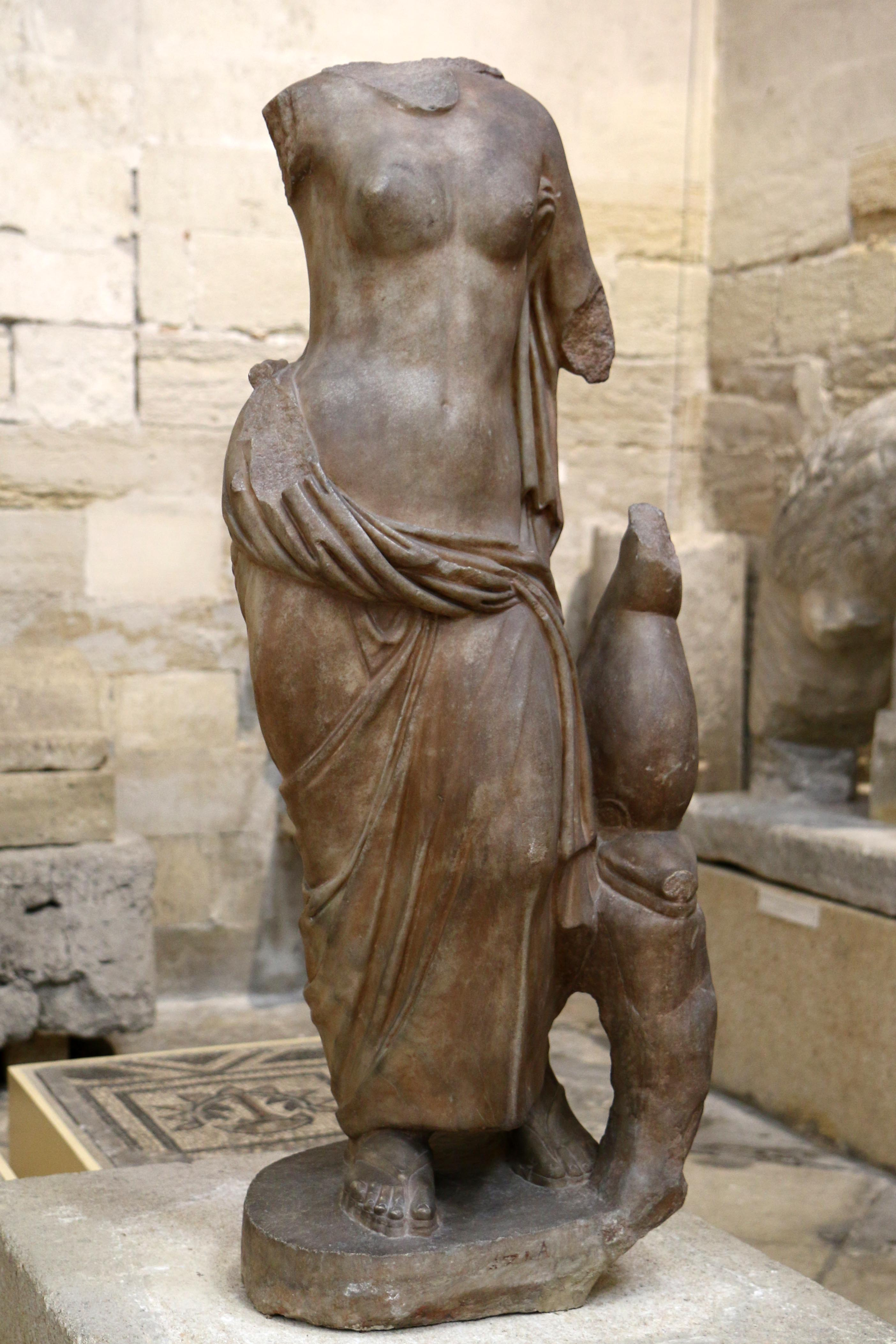
Woman

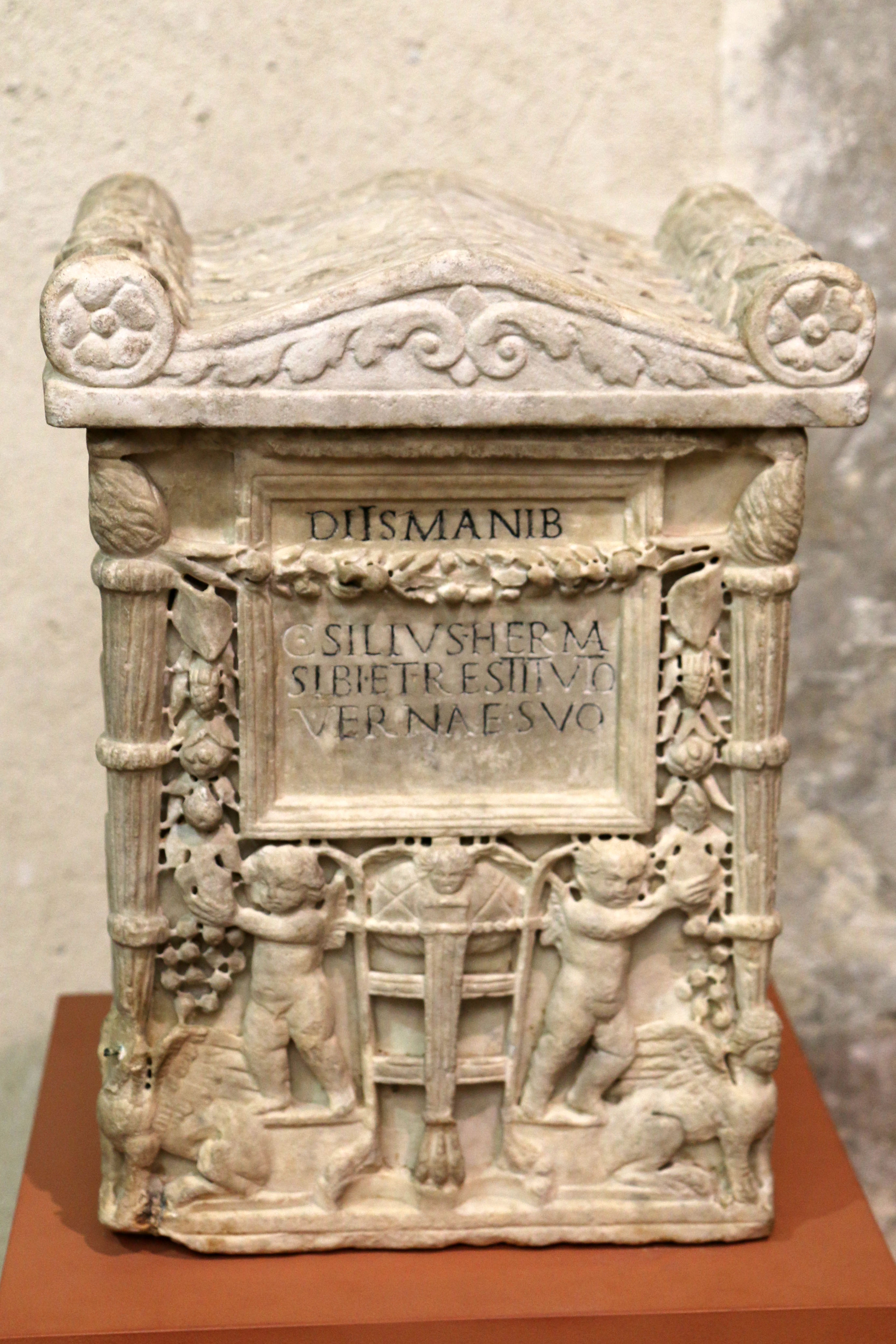
Silius Herma urn

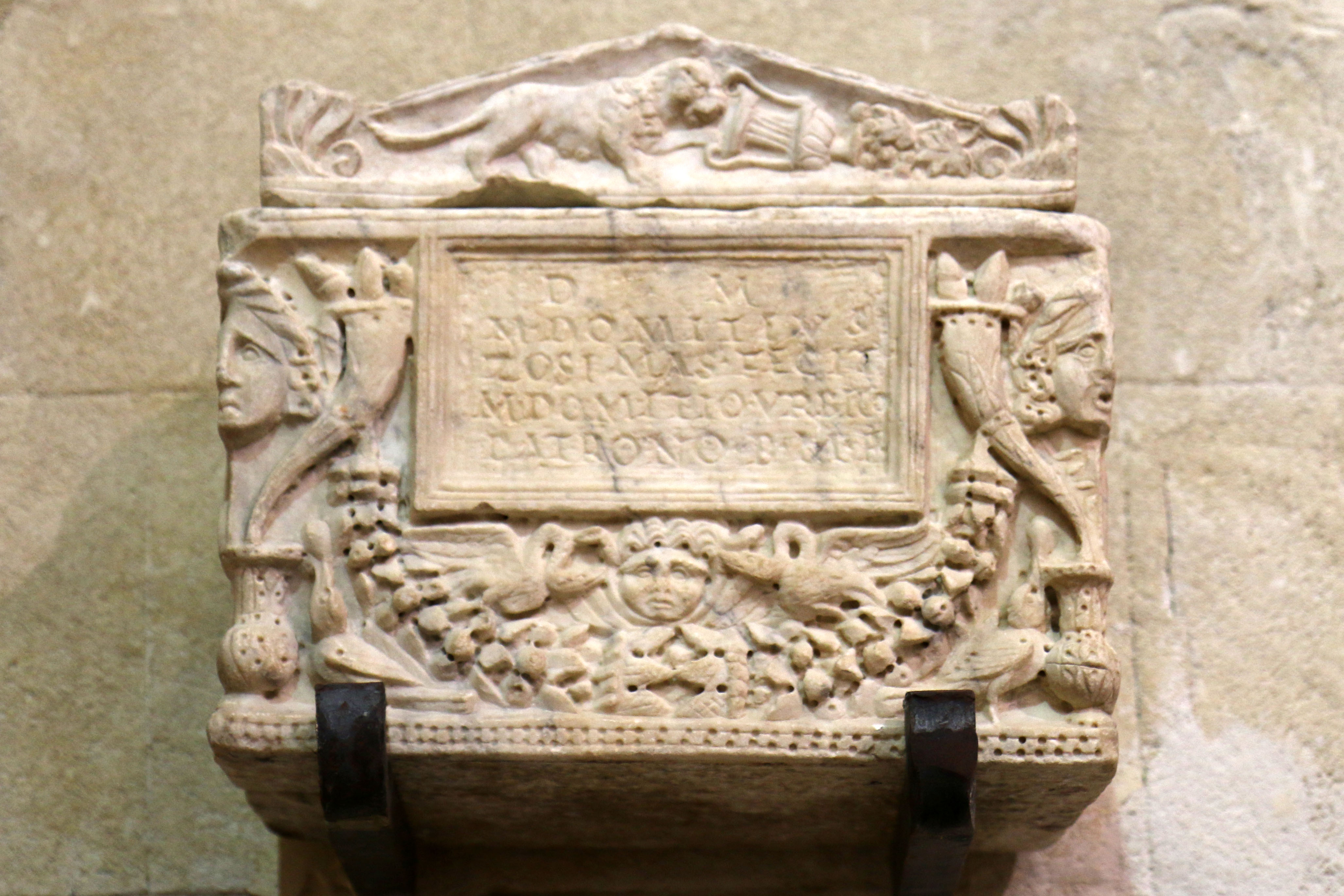
Marcus Domitius urn

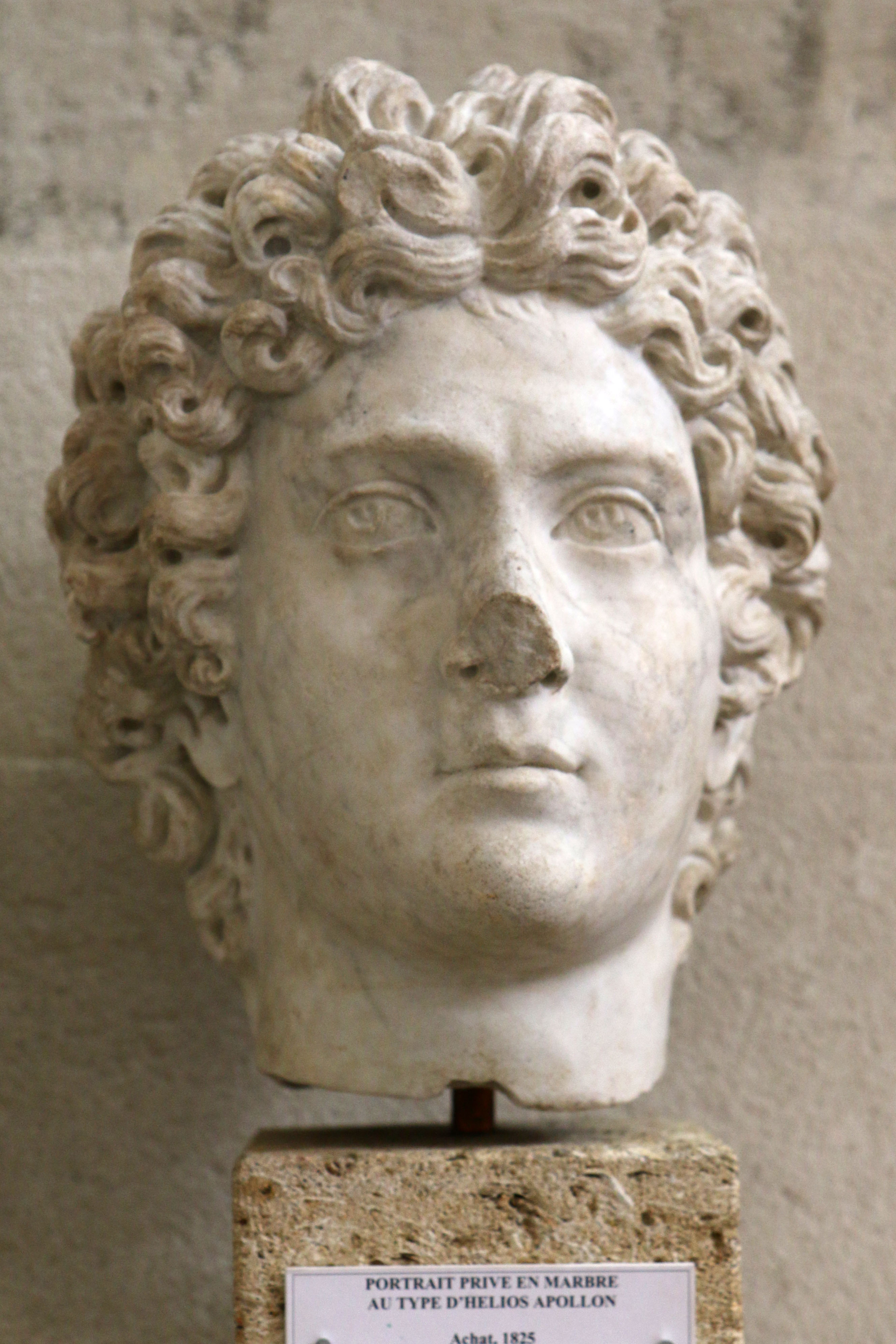
Man's head

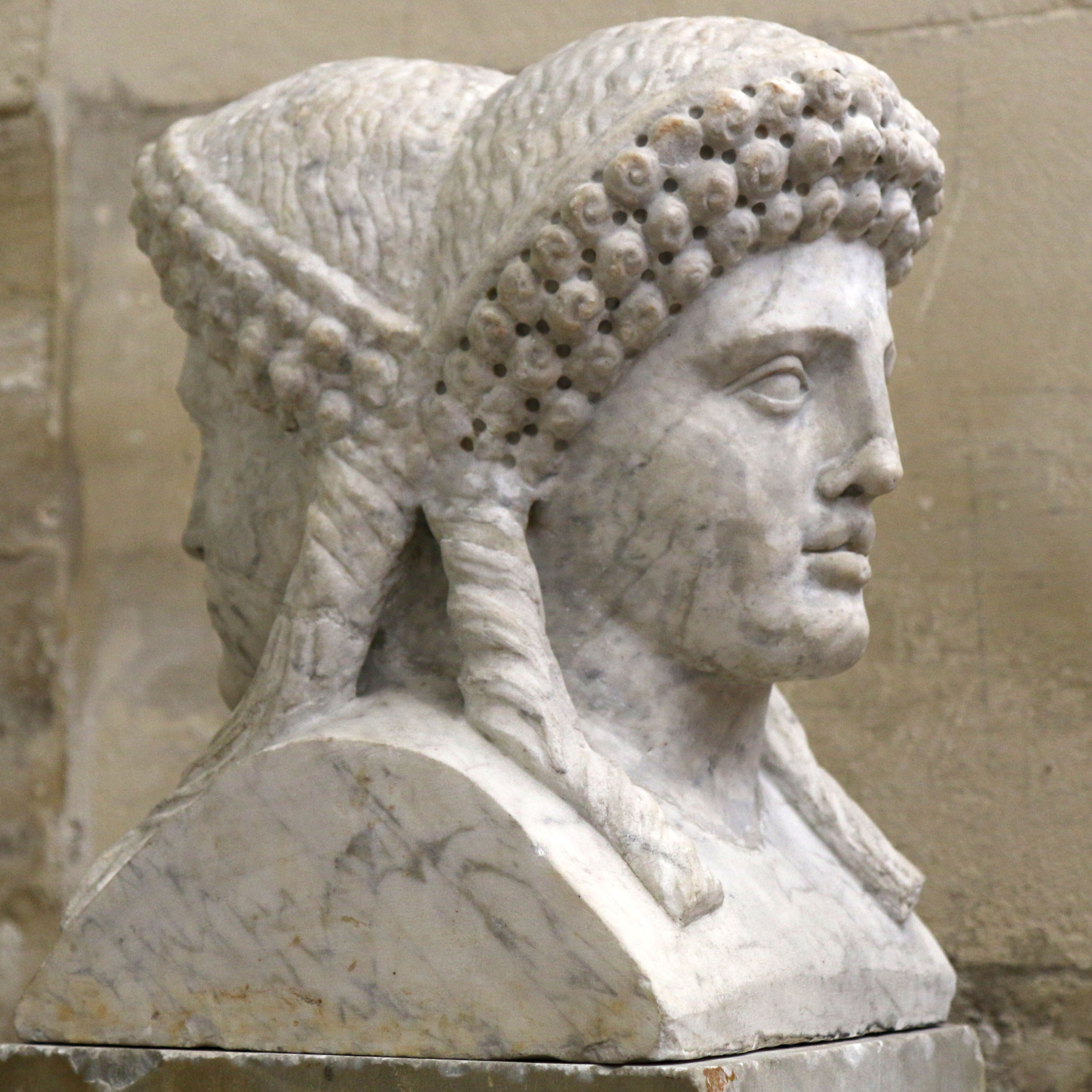
Two-headed Hermes

== See also ==
- List of Jesuit sites

== Bibliography ==
- Joseph Girard, Évocation du Vieil Avignon, Les Éditions de Minuit, Paris, 2000, ISBN 270731353X
