= Hajduk (disambiguation) =

A hajduk is a type of irregular infantry found in Central and parts of Southeast Europe from the late 16th to mid 19th centuries.

Hajduk may also refer to:

It may also refer to the following sport clubs:

- HNK Hajduk Split, Croatian football club
- FK Hajduk Beograd, Serbian football club
- FK Hajduk Kula, Serbian football club
- FK Hajduk Veljko, Serbian football club

It may also refer to the following people:

- Anja Hajduk (born 1963), German politician
- Frankie Hejduk, American football (soccer) player
- John Hejduk, American architect, artist and educator
- Milan Hejduk, Czech ice hockey player
- Stacy Haiduk, American actress

== See also ==
- Hajdú (disambiguation)
