= Julija =

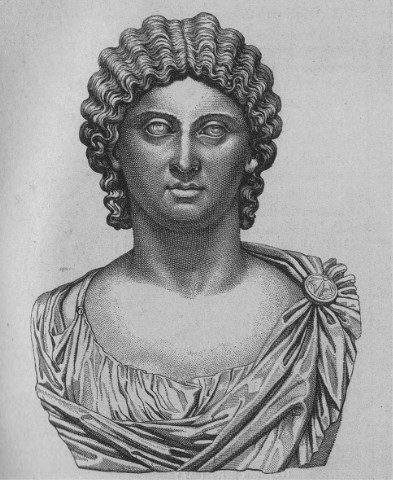
Julia Domna

Julija (different forms: Julia, Julijana, Giulia) is a feminine given name. Notable people with the name include:

- Julija Beniuseviciute (1845–1921), Lithuanian/Samogitian writer (pen name Žemaitė)
- Julija Matej (born 1925, died before 2012), Serbian athlete
- Julija Portjanko (born 1983), Macedonian handball player
- Julija Pranaitytė (1881–1944), Lithuanian newspaper editor, book publisher, and traveller
- Jūlija Sokolova (born 1991), Latvian football striker
- Julija Stepanenko (born 1977), Latvian politician and lawyer
- Julija Stoliarenko (born 1993), Lithuanian mixed martial arts and Lethwei fighter
- Jūlija Vansoviča (born 1975), Latvian fencer

== See also ==
- Yuliya, given name
- Julia (given name)
