= Hajdú =

Hajdú and Hajdu may refer to:

- Hajdu, mercenary soldiers in 16th- and 17th-century Hungary
- Hajdú (county), a historical county in the Kingdom of Hungary
- Hajdú-Bihar, a modern county in eastern Hungary
- Hajdu–Cheney syndrome, an extremely rare genetic disorder of the connective tissue
- Hajdú, a surname:
  - Andre Hajdu (1932–2016), Israeli composer born in Hungary
  - David Hajdu (born 1955), American columnist
  - Étienne Hajdú (1907–1996), Transylvania-born French sculptor
  - Georg Hajdu (born 1960), German composer and music theorist
  - Júlia Hajdú (1925–1987), Hungarian composer and pianist
  - Lili Hajdú Gimesné (1891–1960), Hungarian psychiatrist and psychoanalyst
  - Markéta Hajdu (born 1974), Czech hammer thrower
  - Márton Hajdu, Hungarian politician
  - Patty Hajdu (born 1966), Canadian politician
