= 2007 European Athletics Indoor Championships – Women's pole vault =

The Women's pole vault event at the 2007 European Athletics Indoor Championships was held on March 3–4.

== Medalists ==
Gold	Silver	Bronze
Svetlana Feofanova; Russia	Yuliya Golubchikova; Russia	Anna Rogowska; Poland

== Results ==
=== Qualification ===
Qualification: Qualification Performance 5.55 (Q) or at least 8 best performers advanced to the final.

Rank	Group	Athlete	Nationality	3.75	4.05	4.25	4.40	4.50	4.55	Result	Notes
1.	A	Svetlana Feofanova	Russia	–	–	–	o	xxo	xo	4.55	Q
2.	A	Yuliya Golubchikova	Russia	–	–	o	o	o	xxo	4.55	Q
3.	B	Vanessa Boslak	France	–	–	o	o	o		4.50	q
3.	B	Anna Rogowska	Poland	–	–	o	–	o		4.50	q
5.	B	Pavla Rybová	Czech Republic	–	–	xo	o	o		4.50	q
5.	B	Silke Spiegelburg	Germany	–	–	o	xo	o		4.50	q, SB
7.	A	Julia Hütter	Germany	–	o	o	xxo	o	xxx	4.50	q
8.	B	Róża Kasprzak	Poland	–	–	o	xxo	xo		4.50	q, =PB
9.	A	Joanna Piwowarska	Poland	–	o	o	xxo	xxo		4.50	PB
10.	A	Katerina Badurová	Czech Republic	–	–	o	o	xxx		4.40	
10.	B	Carolin Hingst	Germany	–	–	o	o	xxx		4.40	
10.	B	Hanna-Mia Persson	Sweden	–	o	o	o	xxx		4.40	NR
13.	A	Naroa Agirre	Spain	–	o	o	xo	xxx		4.40	
14.	A	Kate Dennison	Great Britain	–	xo	o	xo	xxx		4.40	PB
15.	A	Linda Berglund	Sweden	xo	o	xo	xo	xxx		4.40	NR
16.	A	Krisztina Molnár	Hungary	–	o	o	xxx			4.25	
16.	B	Aleksandra Kiryashova	Russia	–	o	o	xxx			4.25	
18.	B	Tina Šutej	Slovenia	o	o	xxx				4.05	
18.	B	Anita Tørring	Denmark	o	o	xxx				4.05	
20.	A	Anna Fitidou	Cyprus	o	xo	xxx				4.05	
21.	A	Eleonor Tavares	Portugal	o	xxx					3.75	
	B	Minna Nikkanen	Finland	xxx						NM	

=== Final ===
Rank	Athlete	Nationality	4.23	4.38	4.48	4.58	4.66	4.71	4.76	Result	Notes
1st place, gold medalist(s)	Svetlana Feofanova	Russia	–	o	o	o	o	xx–	o	4.76	SB
2nd place, silver medalist(s)	Yuliya Golubchikova	Russia	o	o	o	o	xo	xo	xxx	4.71	SB
3rd place, bronze medalist(s)	Anna Rogowska	Poland	o	–	o	xo	o	xxx		4.66	
4	Pavla Rybová	Czech Republic	xxo	–	o	o	xxx			4.58	
5	Silke Spiegelburg	Germany	o	xxo	o	xxx				4.48	
6	Julia Hütter	Germany	o	xxx						4.23	
6	Róża Kasprzak	Poland	o	xxx						4.23	
6	Vanessa Boslak	France	o	–	xxx					4.23	
