= 2005 European Athletics U23 Championships – Women's pole vault =

The women's pole vault event at the 2005 European Athletics U23 Championships was held in Erfurt, Germany, at Steigerwaldstadion on 17 July.

== Medalists ==
Gold	Nataliya Kushch; Ukraine
Silver	Floé Kühnert; Germany
Bronze	Julia Hütter; Germany

== Results ==
=== Final ===
17 July

Rank	Name	Nationality	Attempts								Result	Notes
Rank	Name	Nationality	3.60	3.80	4.00	4.10	4.20	4.25	4.30	4.35	Result	Notes
1st place, gold medalist(s)	Nataliya Kushch	Ukraine	–	–	o	–	o	–	o	xxx	4.30	
2nd place, silver medalist(s)	Floé Kühnert	Germany	–	–	–	xo	o	–	o	xxx	4.30	
3rd place, bronze medalist(s)	Julia Hütter	Germany	–	o	o	o	xo	o	xx–	x	4.25	
4	Simone Langhirt	Germany	–	–	o	o	o	xxx			4.20	
5	Zoë Brown	United Kingdom	–	o	o	xo	xo	xxx			4.20	
6	Amélie Delzenne	France	–	o	o	xxo	xo	xxx			4.20	
7	Paulina Dębska	Poland	–	o	xo	xo	xxx				4.10	
8	Dimitra Emmanouil	Greece	–	o	xxo	xo	xxx				4.10	
9	Rianna Galiart	Netherlands	o	o	o	xxo	xxx				4.10	
10	Slavica Semenjuk	Serbia and Montenegro	–	xo	xo	xxx					4.00	
11	Elise Carmignani	France	–	o	xxo	xxx					4.00	
12	Elodie Berge	France	o	o	xxx						3.80	
12	Zsuzsa Lendvai	Hungary	o	o	xxx						3.80	
12	Anna Olko	Poland	o	o	xxx						3.80	
12	Nicole Büchler	Switzerland	–	o	xxx						3.80	
16	Justyna Ratajczak	Poland	o	xo	xxx						3.80	

== Participation ==
According to an unofficial count, 16 athletes from 10 countries participated in the event.

- France (3)
- Germany (3)
- Greece (1)
- Hungary (1)
- Netherlands (1)
- Poland (3)
- Serbia and Montenegro (1)
- Switzerland (1)
- Ukraine (1)
- United Kingdom (1)
