= Róża Kasprzak =

Polish pole vaulter

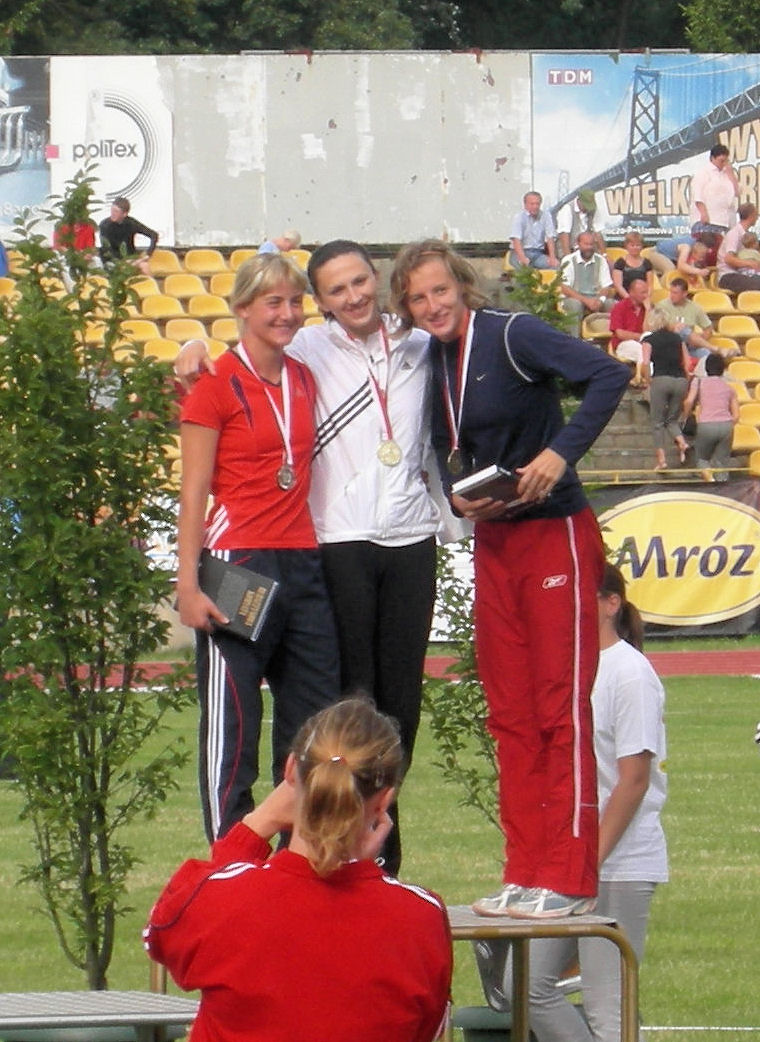
Kasprzak (first from right) in 2007

Róza Kasprzak (born 9 April 1982 in Trzcianka) is a Polish former pole vaulter.

Her personal indoor best is 4.50 metres (14.8 ft), achieved in 2007.

== International competitions ==
Year	Competition	Venue	Position	Notes
2003	European U23 Championships	Bydgoszcz, Poland	20th (q)	3.80 m
2005	Universiade	İzmir, Turkey	6th	4.10 m
2006	European Championships	Gothenburg, Sweden	8th	4.40 m
2007	European Indoor Championships	Birmingham, United Kingdom	6th	4.23 m
