= Athletics at the 2005 Summer Universiade – Women's pole vault =

The women's pole vault event at the 2005 Summer Universiade was held on 17 August in İzmir, Turkey.

== Results ==
Rank	Athlete	Nationality	3.60	3.80	3.90	4.00	4.10	4.15	4.20	4.25	4.30	Result	Notes
1st place, gold medalist(s)	Julia Hütter	Germany	–	o	–	xxo	xo	xxo	o	xxo	xxx	4.25	
2nd place, silver medalist(s)	Nadine Rohr	Switzerland	–	xo	–	o	o	xxo	xo	xx–	x	4.20	
3rd place, bronze medalist(s)	Dimitra Emmanouil	Greece	–	–	–	xxo	xxo	–	xo	xxx		4.20	SB
4	Slavica Semenjuk	Serbia and Montenegro	o	o	o	xo	o	xo	xxx			4.15	NR
5	Simone Langhirt	Germany	–	–	–	xo	xxo	xo	xx–	x		4.15	
6	Róża Kasprzak	Poland	–	–	xo	–	xo	–	xxx			4.10	
7	Anastasiya Kiryanova	Russia	–	–	–	o	xxx					4.00	
7	Teja Melink	Slovenia	–	o	–	o	xxx					4.00	
9	Joana Costa	Brazil	–	o	xo	o	xxx					4.00	
9	Yuliya Golubchikova	Russia	–	xo	–	o	xxx					4.00	
11	Amélie Delzenne	France	–	o	–	xxo	xxx					4.00	
12	Nina Vezjak	Slovenia	–	xxo	–	xxo	xxx					4.00	
13	Mar Sánchez	Spain	–	–	o	–	xxx					3.90	
14	Zoë Brown	Great Britain	xo	xxo	o	xxx						3.90	
15	Adrianne Vangool	Canada	–	o	xxx							3.80	
16	Sue Kupper	Canada	o	xo	xxx							3.80	
16	Fanni Juhász	Hungary	o	xo	–	xxx						3.80	
18	Nicole Büchler	Switzerland	o	xxo	xxx							3.80	
	Dana Cervantes	Spain	–	–	–	xxx						NM	
	Sandra-Helena Tavares	Portugal	–	xxx								NM	
	Anita Tørring	Denmark	–	xxx								NM	
	Alejandra Meza	Mexico										DNF	
