= Yuria (given name) =

- Gender: Female

Origin
- Origin: Japanese
- Meaning: Different meanings depending on the kanji used

Yuria (written: 結李愛, 由梨愛 or ゆりあ in hiragana) is a feminine Japanese given name. Notable people with the name include:

- Yuria Haga (芳賀 優里亜; born 1987), Japanese model and actress
- Yuria Katō (加藤 結李愛; born 2003), Japanese shogi player
- Yuria Kizaki (木﨑 ゆりあ; born 1996), Japanese actress, singer and idol
- Yuria Obara (小原 由梨愛; born 1990), Japanese women's footballer
- Yuria Yoshine (吉根ゆりあ, born 1994 ), Japanese AV actress

== See also ==
- Yulia, a similarly-sounding European and Slavic feminine given name
