= Yulia Sister =

Soviet Moldavian and Israeli chemist-analyst

- יוליה סיסטר
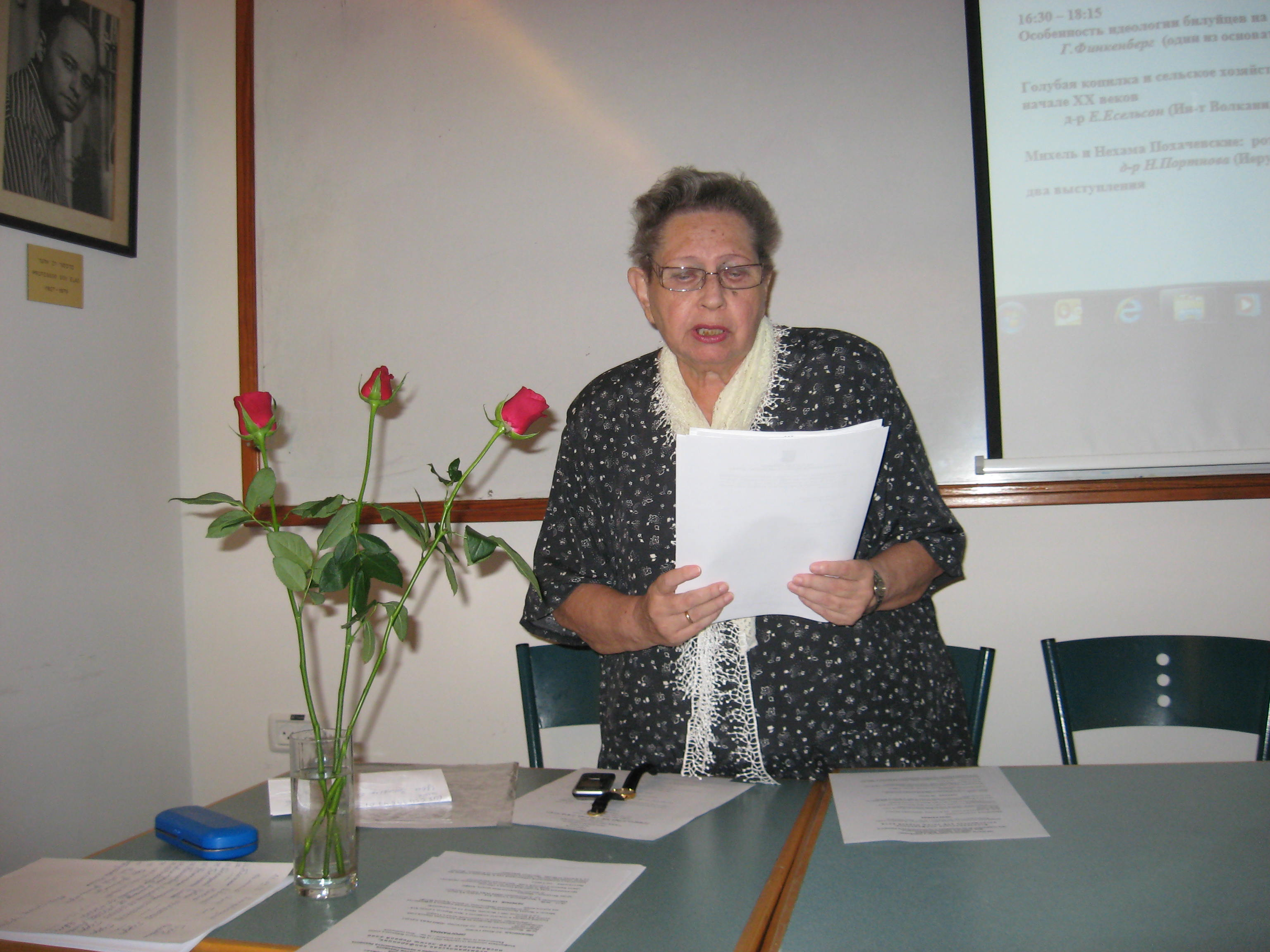
- Born: Юлия Давидовна Систер; September 12, 1936 (age 90); Chișinău, Kingdom of Romania
- Citizenship: Israeli
- Education: Ph.D. chemistry
- Alma mater: University of Chișinău; Academy of Sciences of Moldova
- Awards: Medal of VDNKh (Russia); Awards of the Mendeleev Chemical Society of the USSR
- Scientific career
- Fields: Analytical chemistry, History of science
- Workplaces: Institute of Chemistry of the Academy of Sciences of Moldova; Hebrew University of Jerusalem; Tel Aviv University
- Thesis: Electrochemical Research and Analysis Methods of Sulfur-Containing Organic Matters (1967)

Yulia Sister (Hebrew: יוליה סיסטר, Russian: Юлия Давидовна Систер; born September 12, 1936, in Chișinău, Bessarabia, Romania) is a Soviet Moldavian and Israeli analytical chemist engaged in chemical research with the use of polarography and chromatography, a science historian, and a researcher of Russian Jewry in Israel, France, and other countries. She holds the position of Director General of the Research Centre for Russian Jews abroad and in Israel.

== Biography ==
=== Early childhood and schools ===
Yulia Sister was born in 1936 in Chișinău (Russian: Kishinev), at the time in the Kingdom of Romania, a city which later became the capital of the Moldavian SSR and since 1991 is the capital of Moldova. Her parents and paternal grandparents were also born in this city. The grandparents were there and survived the pogrom of 1903.

David Iosifovich, Yulia's father, was a doctor educated in Prague at Charles University. He used to tell his daughter about his student years, the Bessarabian association of fellow-countrymen in Prague and his meetings with famous people. Yulia's mother Yevgenia (Bathsheba) Moiseevna copied for her by hand children's verses and Yulia learned to read quite early. Among the first poems was "What Is Good and What Is Bad" by Mayakovsky.

Yulia's grandparents stuck to traditions and spoke Yiddish, and grandfather Yosef (Iosif) even wrote Yiddish poetry. But Yulia could hardly remember them. Her grandfather Moshe (Moisei) died before she was born; her parental grandparents lost their lives in the Kishinev Ghetto in the Holocaust and her grandmother Sarah died during the World War II in evacuation.

During the 2nd World War Bessarabia was reclaimed and then occupied by the Soviet Union in June 1940. A year later in July 1941 it was reconquered by Germany and Romania, and in August 1944 reoccupied by the Soviet Union. In her memoirs Yulia recalled the day when the Red Army entered Kishinev. She also remembered the German bombing of the city and the air raids on the roads, by which her family escaped to the East from the Nazis.

At the beginning of the war David Sister and his family was evacuated to the left bank of the Volga River where he was appointed chief physician at the district hospital and a consultant of the nearby military hospital. The hospital was located in the open steppe between two villages and on the other side of Volga there was Stalingrad. The family lived there a few years. There were no other children in the neighborhood and Yulia had no friends to play with. But she was fascinated by the local nature and made observations of plants and animals. The inhabitants of the hospital could hear the cannonade from the other bank, and during the battle of Stalingrad it became particularly strong.

In 1944 Yulia's family moved to Kirovograd where she, after a year's delay, was enrolled in the first grade of primary education. A year later the family came back to the native city of Kishinev. Despite severe post-war shortages and difficulties, the Sister's family succeeded to restore their home, which included a huge library. Among the family friends and guests were writers, actors, musicians and scientists, and Yulia grew up in an atmosphere of thirst for knowledge.

Between the years of 1945 and 1954 Yulia Sister studied at the School for Girls Number 2 in Kishinev. Chemistry was taught very passionately by a teacher that loved the subject and was able to convey her enthusiasm to the students. On the advice of her teacher Sister participated in the chemistry enrichment program for school children that was carried out by Professor Anton Ablov at the University of Kishinev.

=== Education and research career ===
Yulia Sister entered the Department of Chemistry of the University of Kishinev in the fall 1954. While asked by Professor Iurie Lealicov, who interviewed the applicants to the Department, why she has chosen this Department, she explained that thanks to her school teacher she fell in love with chemistry. At the University Yulia was involved in various campus activities, and served as an editor of the faculty newspaper "Chemist". Since her second year at the university she became a member of the student scientific society and was engaged in the research of compounds called heteropolyacids. In 1959 Sister successfully defended her Master's thesis "Precipitation chromatography of heteropolyacids." and graduated with honors from the University of Kishinev.

Upon completion of the studies Sister was assigned to the laboratory of analytical chemistry headed by Professor Yuri Lyalikov. The laboratory was a part of the Institute of Chemistry at the Moldavian branch of the Academy of Sciences of the USSR, which became the Academy of Sciences of Moldova in 1961. Working in this laboratory allowed the young chemist Sister to begin her research with new polarographic methods. In order to carry out analysis of organic compounds by the means of alternating-current (ac) polarography Yulia built with her own hands a polarograph and received the first polarograms. Sister was the first in Moldova (with Y. S. Lyalikov), who applied the methods of ac polarography and second harmonic ac polarography for analyzing organic compounds. Then, together with the physicist Vil Senkevich, they assembled an automatic device, and only later began the serial production of polarographs in the USSR. In the early 1960s Yulia published her first research articles. In 1967 she received her Ph.D. from the Institute of Chemistry of the Moldavian Academy of Sciences.

Through 25 years of research at the Institute of Chemistry Sister dealt with a wide range of topics. Her ecology oriented research included analysis of pesticides in environmental samples, food items and biological mediums. She participated in research and analysis of suspensions and was involved in analyzing new organic compounds. Sister made a substantial contribution to the development of such methods as the second harmonic ac polarography, the difference polarography with magnetic recording, the chromatopolarography. For about 20 years Yulia Sister served as a consultant on the use of the polarographic method in biology at the Department of Human and Animal Physiology of the University of Kishinev.

In 1984 Yulia Sister was invited to work with the Institute of Technology and Development where she soon headed the laboratory of physical and chemical methods. The Institute was affiliated to a research and production association in the Ialoveni (formerly Kutuzov). Sister and her laboratory were using a variety of research methods and among them the high-performance liquid chromatography being at that time a new approach in the laboratories of the country. She also contributed as a board member of Moldavian branch of the Mendeleev Chemical Society and led the program "Young Chemist" in the Moldavian Republic. Many of her students, the former young chemists, became later scientists and managers of respectable companies.

=== New activities and challenges ===
Yulia Sister and her family repatriated to Israel in 1990. In 1992–1993 she served as a senior researcher of the Department of Inorganic and Analytical Chemistry at the Hebrew University of Jerusalem, and then she was engaged in the topics related to the analysis of biological objects at the Tel Aviv University. During these years, along with her career in chemistry, Yulia Sister became deeply interested in the study of Russian-Jewish culture.

In 1991 Sister began to write for the Shorter Jewish Encyclopedia (SJE) as a non-staff editor. She served as a research fellow covering the field of history of science and wrote about 90 articles for the encyclopedia. Yulia is the author of the articles "Chemistry" (jointly with P. Smorodnitsky), "Veniamin Levich", "Frederick Reines", "Moise Haissinsky", "Yuri Golfand" and many others.

Yulia Sister's activities in the House of Scientists and Experts of Rehovot started in 1991. Within this forum she organizes lectures, seminars and scientific conferences. She leads the scientific seminars of the House of Scientists that are regularly held at the Weizmann Institute of Science. In 2008, and then in 2014 she organized conferences devoted to the Bilu movement and to the First Aliyah. She also maintains friendly contacts with foreign colleagues, such as the Club of Russian-speaking scientists of Massachusetts.

In 1997 Mikhail Parkhomovsky initiated creation of the Research Center for Russian Jewry Abroad, which aimed to collect and publish information on Jews, who emigrated from the Russian Empire, Soviet Union or Post-Soviet states and made a contribution to world civilization. Parkhomovsky became the Scientific Director and Chief Editor and Yulia Sister Director General of the Center. From 2012 the Center changed its name to Research Centre for Russian Jews abroad and in Israel (Erzi). The collection, processing and publication of materials related to Russian Jewry are organized by Sister. By 2015 the Center published about 30 volumes of collections, including books devoted to Jews in England, France, U.S., Israel and other countries. In addition to her executive functions, Sister is a frequent editor and author of the Center's collective monographs. She is the editor of the 17th volume ("Let Us Build the Walls of Jerusalem. Book 3"), a coeditor of the 11th volume ("Let Us Build the Walls of Jerusalem. Book 1") and of the monograph "Israel, Russian Roots", and a participant in the editing of the 10th volume.

Sister's activities include the organization of seminars and conferences. The following examples are a small sampling of the events organized by the Director General of the Center. In 1999 she was the coordinator of the conference dedicated to the 50th anniversary of the Weizmann Institute in Rehovot. Together with Prof. Aron Cherniak she published a detailed report on the conference and some of its materials in the 8th volume of the "Russian Jewry Abroad" series. In 2003 Sister led a conference in Kiryat Ekron, in which she introduced the contribution of the Russian Aliyah to Israeli science, culture and education. More than 200 scientists from all over the country participated at the tenth-anniversary of the Center conference in 2007. The 2012 conference was devoted to the 130th anniversary of the First Aliyah and the event was covered by the House of Scientists of Rehovot.

Yulia Sister lives with her family in Kiryat Ekron. Her husband, Boris (Bezalel) Iosifovich Gendler, is a physician with an extensive experience in medical practice and education. After his repatriation from Kishinev Bezalel Gendler worked as a doctor in one of the Israeli hospitals and published several articles, some of them in collaboration with Yulia.

== Selected publications ==
=== Chemistry ===
Yulia Sister is the author or co-author of more than 200 scientific publications.

- Y. D. Sister; et al. (1967). "Polarography with 2,6-dimercapto-1,4-tiopiron-3-carboxylic acid and thiophenols". Elektrokhimiya (in Russian). 3 (6).
- A.M. Arishkevich; Y. D. Sister; et al. (1969). "Analytical application of dimercaptothiopyrones in ac polarography". In A. V. Ablov; et al. (eds.). Research on the chemistry of coordination compounds and physico-chemical analytical methods (in Russian). Kishinev: Ştiinţa.
- V. V. Senkevich; Y. D. Sister; Y. S. Lyalikov (1972). "Second harmonic ac polarography in analyzing organic compounds". Journal of Analytical Chemistry of the USSR (in Russian). 27.
- S. G. Supin; Y. D. Sister; I. V. Kozlova (1972). "Polarographic Methods for Analysis of Pesticides". In Y. S. Lyalikov; Y. D. Sister; et al. (eds.). Problems of analytical chemistry. Volume II (in Russian). Moscow: Nauka. pp. 145–155.
- Y. S. Lyalikov; L. G. Madan; Y. D. Sister (1974). Physico-chemical methods of analysis (manual for higher school) (in Russian) (5th ed.). Moscow: Chimiya.
- V. V. Senkevich; Y. D. Sister; L. G. Madan (1975). New directions in polarographic method (in Russian). Kishinev: Ştiinţa.
- Y. D. Sister (1977). "The development of new variations of polarography and their application in the analysis of organic compounds". In I. P. Stradynia; S. G. Mairanovskii (eds.). Polarography: Problems and Prospects (in Russian). Riga: Zinatne.
- Y. D. Sister (1981). "Search for optimal conditions for polarographic-determination of treflan". Journal of Analytical Chemistry of the USSR (in Russian) (8).
- N.A. Adamova; Y.D. Sister; et al. (1986). "Determination of some surfactants by method of alternating-current polarography". Izvestiya Akademii Nauk Moldavskoi SSR. Biological and Chemical Sciences (in Russian).

=== History of science in Erzi publications ===
- Sister, Yulia (2001). "Elie Shlyakhov in the Pasteur Institute". In Parkhomovsky, Mikhail; Gouzevitch, Dmitri (eds.). Pyccкие евреи во Франции. Книга 1 [Russian Jews in France. Book 1]. Russian Jewry Abroad (in Russian). Vol. 8. Research Centre for Russian Jewry Abroad. pp. 313–317. ISBN 965-222-911-3.
- Sister, Yulia (2002). "Moïse Haïssinsky". In Parkhomovsky, Mikhail; Gouzevitch, Dmitri (eds.). Pyccкие евреи во Франции. Книга 2 [Russian Jews in France. Book 2]. Russian Jewry Abroad (in Russian). Vol. 9. Research Centre for Russian Jewry Abroad. pp. 264–272. ISBN 965-222-911-3.
- Tsukerblat, Boris; Sister, Yulia; Jignea, Clara (2005). "Academician Isaak Bersuker". In Zaltsberg, Ernst; Parkhomovsky, Mikhail (eds.). Pyccкие евреи в Америке. Книга 1 [Russian Jews in America. Book 1]. Russian Jewry Abroad (in Russian). Vol. 12. Research Centre for Russian Jewry Abroad. pp. 175–186. ISBN 965-222-911-3.
- Sister, Yulia (2008). "Professor Shifrin and His Medical Team". In Sister, Yulia (ed.). Идемте же отстроим стены Йерушалаима. Книга 3 [Let Us Build the Wall of Jerusalem. Book 3]. Russian Jewry Abroad (in Russian). Vol. 17. Research Centre for Russian Jewry Abroad. pp. 260–272. ISBN 978-965-222-911-3.
- Sister, Yulia (2011). "About chemists and chemistry in a country flowing with milk and honey". In Parkhomovsky, Mikhail; Sister, Yulia (eds.). Израиль: русские корни [Israel: Russian roots] (in Russian). Research Centre for Russian Jewry Abroad. pp. 256–290. ISBN 978-965-90976-7-8.

=== History of science in other publications ===
- Yulia Sister (December 2009). "About the book "Israel in space" and its author" (in Russian). The House of Scientists and Experts of Rehovot.
- Yulia Sister (November 2010). "Boris Emmanuilovich Khesin" (in Russian). The House of Scientists and Experts of Rehovot.
- Yulia Sister (2011). "About chemists and chemistry in a country flowing with milk and honey" (in Russian). Russian literary echo.
- Yulia Sister (November 2012). "Academician Yakov Kivovich Syrkin" (in Russian). The House of Scientists and Experts of Rehovot.
- Yulia Sister (23 December 2012). "In memory of professor Vilderman" (in Russian). Portal Dorledor.
- Yulia Sister (10 September 2013). "André Lwoff, Nobel Prize Laureate" (in Russian). Lib.ru.
- Yulia Sister (24 October 2013). "The laureate of the Palladium medal (Alexander Frumkin)" (in Russian). Online newspaper at NewsWe.com.

=== Russian Jewry in Israel ===
- Sister, Yulia; Parkhomovsky, Mikhail, eds. (2005). Идемте же отстроим стены Йерушалаима. Книга 1 [Let Us Build the Walls of Jerusalem. Book 1]. Russian Jewry Abroad (in Russian). Vol. 11. Research Centre for Russian Jewry Abroad. ISBN 965-222-911-3.
- Sister, Yulia, ed. (2008). Идемте же отстроим стены Йерушалаима. Книга 3 [Let Us Build the Walls of Jerusalem. Book 3]. Russian Jewry Abroad (in Russian). Vol. 17. Research Centre for Russian Jewry Abroad. ISBN 978-965-222-911-3.
- Sister, Yulia; Parkhomovsky, Mikhail, eds. (2011). Израиль: русские корни [Israel: Russian roots] (in Russian). Research Centre for Russian Jewry Abroad. ISBN 978-965-90976-7-8.

=== Other publications ===
- Yulia Sister; Bezalel Gendler (2001). "Bessarabian Jews in the French Resistance. Tamara Paghis". In Parkhomovsky, Mikhail; Gouzevitch, Dmitri (eds.). Pyccкие евреи во Франции. Книга 1 [Russian Jews in France. Book 1]. Russian Jewry Abroad (in Russian). Vol. 8. Research Centre for Russian Jewry Abroad. pp. 68–77. ISBN 965-222-911-3.
- Sister, Yulia (2003). "Yitzhak Schneerson's Great Undertaking". In Parkhomovsky, Mikhail (ed.). Pyccкое еврейство в зарубежье [Russian Jewry Abroad]. Russian Jewry Abroad (in Russian). Vol. 10. Research Centre for Russian Jewry Abroad. pp. 451–458. ISBN 965-222-911-3.
- Yulia Sister; Bezalel Gendler (28 September 2010). "From Belts to Sderot" (in Russian). Online newspaper at NewsWe.com.
- Yulia Sister (5 September 2013). "The story of one search" (in Russian). Online newspaper at NewsWe.com.
- R.Kuenzli; B.Rishnyak; Y.Sister, eds. (2015). Чтоб луч свободы не погас. Стихотворения украинских поэтов в переводе на русский язык Марка Каганцова [Lest the spark of freedom be extinguished. Ukrainian poets in Russian translation by Mark Kagantsov] (in Russian and Ukrainian). Lviv: Ukrainski tekhnologii. ISBN 978-966-345-294-4.
- Yulia Sister (26 October 2015). "In Memory of Mikhail Aaronovich Parkhomovsky" (in Russian). Electron's Scientific Seminar at www.elektron2000.com.
