= Julia Harenz =

German politician (born 1994)

Member of the Landtag of Saarland
- Incumbent
- Assumed office 25 April 2022

Personal details
- Born: 27 April 1994 (age 32)
- Party: Social Democratic Party (since 2013)

Julia Harenz (born 27 April 1994) is a German politician serving as a member of the Landtag of Saarland since 2022. She has served as mayor of Wallerfangen mit Oberlimberg since 2019.
