= Julia Eisentraut =

German politician (born 1993)

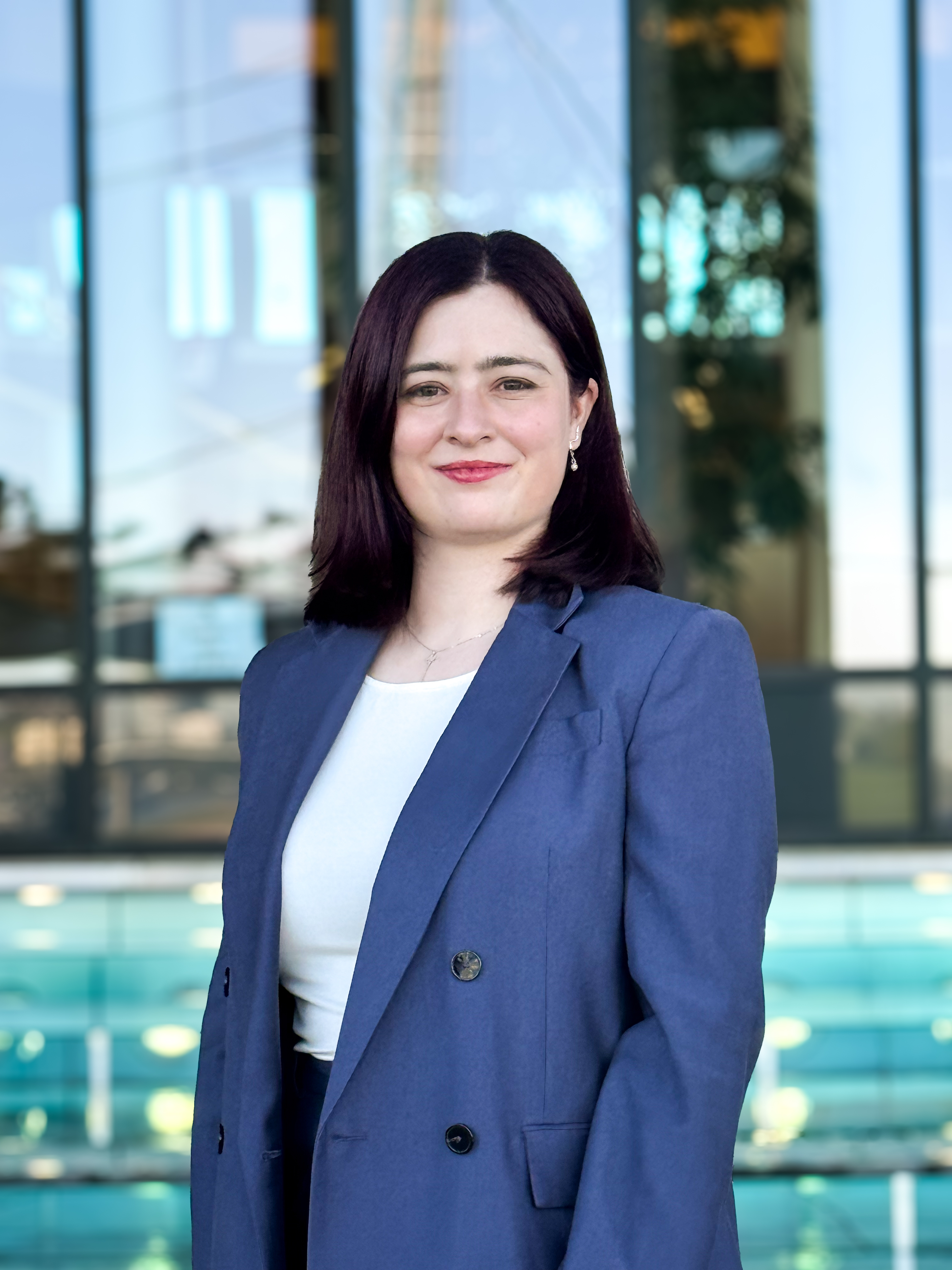
- Eisentraut in 2026

Member of the Landtag of North Rhine-Westphalia
- Incumbent
- Assumed office 1 June 2022

Personal details
- Born: 6 January 1993 (age 33) Homburg, Saarland
- Party: Alliance 90/The Greens

Julia Eisentraut (born 6 January 1993) is a German politician serving as a member of the Landtag of North Rhine-Westphalia since 2022. She is a deputy group leader of Alliance 90/The Greens.
