= Julia Reynolds =

American journalist

Julia Reynolds is an American reporter with the Center for Investigative Reporting. She also edits El Andar, a magazine of Latino politics and culture.

== Career ==
She works as a criminal justice reporter at The Monterey County Herald. Reynolds has reported for Medianews newspapers, PBS, NPR, 60 Minutes, The Nation, and many other media outlets. Her work focuses on gangs, crime and prisons. Prior, she worked as an editor for El Andar. She was a 2009 Nieman Fellow at Harvard University and a 2011 Steinbeck Fellow at San Jose State University.

== Books ==
- “Nuestra Familia“ to be published in the fall of 2014 by Chicago Review Press

== Awards and honors ==
Reynolds has won a number awards from the following:

- National Association of Hispanic Journalists
- The California Public Defenders’ Association
- New California Media
- California Newspaper Publishers Association
- The National Council on Crime and Delinquency
- World Affairs Council
- Investigative Reporters and Editors’ Tom Renner Medal
