= Julia Hütter =

German pole vaulter

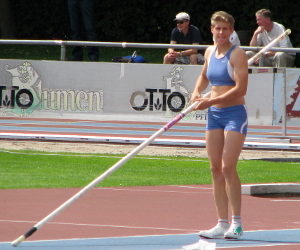
Julia Hütter

Julia Hütter (born 26 July 1983) is a female pole vaulter from Germany. She set her personal best (4.57 metres) on 10 August 2007 at a meet in Leverkusen.

== Competition record ==
Year	Competition	Venue	Position	Notes
Representing Germany
2005	European U23 Championships	Erfurt, Germany	3rd	4.25 m
2005	Universiade	İzmir, Turkey	1st	4.25 m
2007	European Indoor Championships	Birmingham, United Kingdom	6th	4.23 m
2007	World Championships	Osaka, Japan	16th (q)	4.45 m
2008	World Indoor Championships	Valencia, Spain	10th	4.35 m
