= Jean Marc Calvet =

French artist (born 1965)

Jean Marc Calvet (born March 23, 1965) is a French artist living in Granada, Nicaragua. Calvet was one of six winners of the VII Biennale of Nicaraguan Arts in 2009 selected to represent Nicaragua at the Biennale of Central America in Panama in 2010.

Calvet was born in Nice, France. With no prior art experience, Calvet said he began painting at the age of 38 following a drug-induced rage while living in Costa Rica.

Calvet is the subject of a 2010 documentary by British filmmaker Dominic Allan.

== Recognition ==
- Jury Prize, VII Biennale of Nicaraguan Arts (Bienal de Artes Visuales Nicaragüense), Managua, Nicaragua
- Jury Prize (Prix du Jury), Exposition Internationale d'Arts Plastiques, Paris
