= Yuliya Golubchikova =

Russian pole vaulter (born 1983)

Yuliya Alekseyevna Golubchikova (Russian: Юлия Алексеевна Голубчикова; born 27 March 1983 in Moscow, Soviet Union) is a Russian pole vaulter.

Golubchikova's personal best jump is 4.75 metres, achieved at the 2008 Olympic Games in Beijing where she ended on a fourth place (she cleared the same height as eventual bronze medalist Svetlana Feofanova, but Golubchikova needed more attempts). She has 4.75 metres indoor.

== International competitions ==
Representing Russia
| Year | Competition | Venue | Position | Result | Notes |
|---|---|---|---|---|---|
| 2002 | World Junior Championships | Kingston, Jamaica | 2nd | 4.30 m | |
| 2005 | Universiade | İzmir, Turkey | 9th | 4.00 m | |
| 2007 | European Indoor Championships | Birmingham, United Kingdom | 2nd | 4.71 m | |
| 2007 | World Championships | Osaka, Japan | 6th | 4.65 m | |
| 2008 | Olympic Games | Beijing, China | 4th | 4.75 m | |
| 2009 | European Indoor Championships | Turin, Italy | 1st | 4.75 m | |
| 2009 | World Championships | Berlin, Germany | 1st (q) | 4.55 m | |
| 2010 | European Championships | Barcelona, Spain | 7th | 4.55 m | |
