= Fondation Calvet =

Art foundation in Avignon, France

Coordinates: 43°56′49″N 4°48′12″E

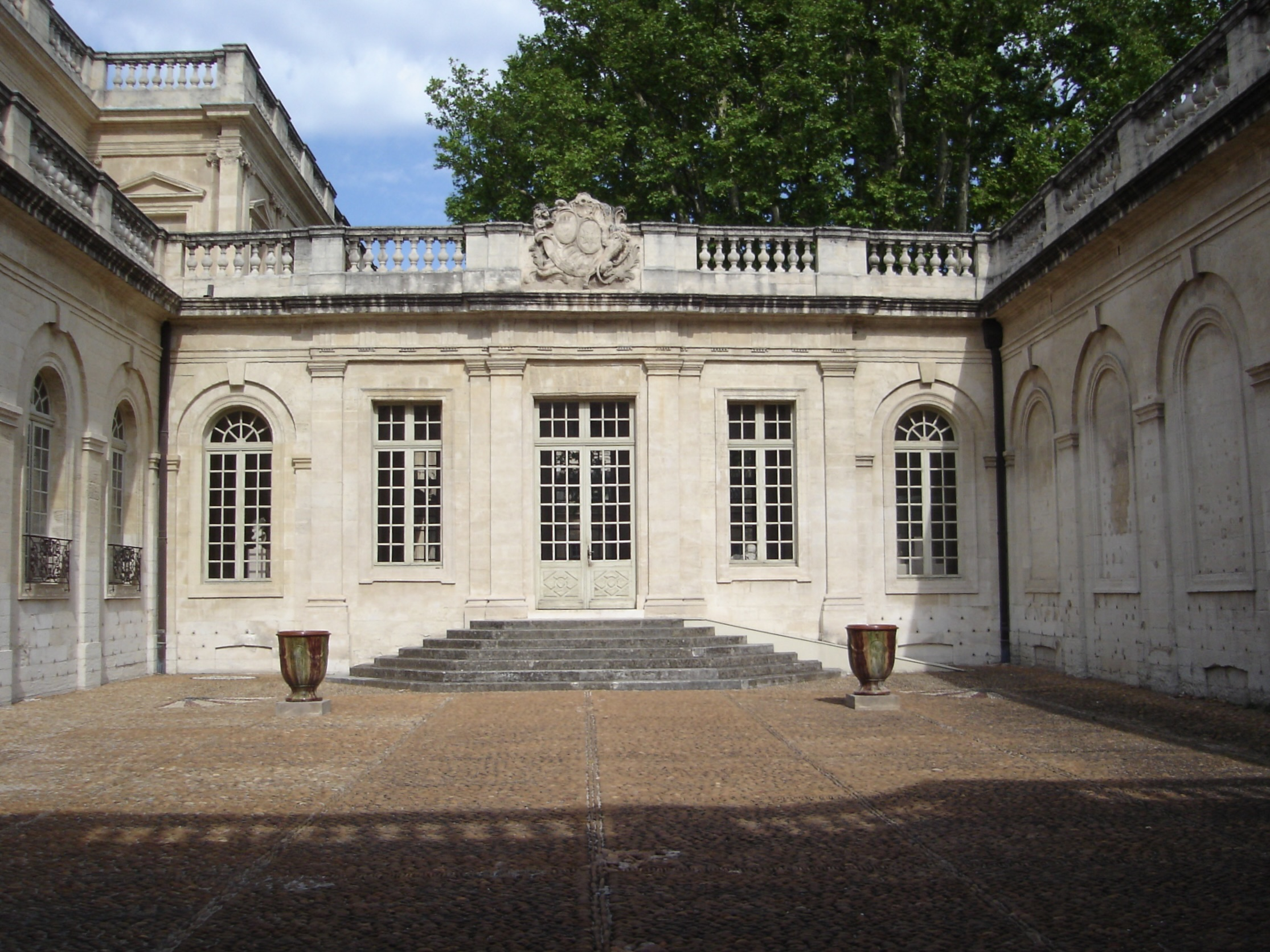
The main courtyard of the Musée Calvet

La Fondation Calvet is an art foundation in Avignon, France, named for Esprit Calvet, who left his collections and library to it in 1810. The foundation maintains several museums and two libraries, with support from the town. The original legacies of paintings, archaeological items, coins and medals, and medieval sculpture have been added to by many other legacies, and a significant deposit of works of art from the Louvre. The archaeological collections and medieval sculpture are now housed separately in the "Musée Lapidaire" - once the chapel of the Jesuit College. The main museum is in an 18th-century city mansion, to which modern buildings have been added; the Library bequeathed by Calvet, and the important collection of over 12,000 coins and medals, have moved to a different location in the city.

The foundation has changed its name on several occasions. It was initially called the "Bibliothèque Calvet", then the "Museum Calvet", then "Musée Calvet", and since 1985 the "Fondation Calvet". The foundation now manages seven museums, two libraries, and an important collection of coins and medals.

In Avignon:

- Bibliothèque Calvet, the main library, housed since 1986 in part of what was once a cardinal's palace, the Livrée Ceccano
- Musée Calvet, the main art gallery, housed in an 18th-century city mansion (a hôtel particulier), the Hôtel de Villeneuve-Martignan
- Médaillier Calvet, a collection of coins and medals
- Musée Lapidaire, a collection of sculptures and archeological finds, housed in what was once the chapel of a Jesuit college
- Museum et Bibliothèque Requien, a natural history museum
- Musée du Petit Palais, a collection of medieval and renaissance paintings

In Cavaillon, 25 km southeast of Avignon:

- Musée Archéologique de l'Hôtel-Dieu
- Musées Jouve et Juif Comtadin

Local painters, including Pierre Parrocel and the Mignard family, are especially well represented, as is Hubert Robert. Other painters include Josse Lieferinxe, Giorgio Vasari, Luca Giordano, Salvator Rosa, Frans Francken the Younger, Jan Brueghel the Younger, Sebastiano Ricci, Giovanni Paolo Pannini, Joseph Vernet, Jacques-Louis David, Alexis Leon Louis Valbrun, Elisabeth Vigée-Lebrun, Théodore Géricault, Honoré Daumier, Camille Corot, Édouard Manet, Alfred Sisley, Maurice de Vlaminck and Chaïm Soutine.
