= Julia Childs =

British playwright

- Born: Julia Kay Childs; 6 March 1962; St Albans, United Kingdom
- Occupations: Playwright, director
- Writing career
- Language: English
- Period: 2007–present
- Genre: Theatre
- Notable awards: Winner African performance 2009, Joint-second place African performance 2010

Julia Childs (born 1962 in St Albans) is a British playwright who has won first and second-place awards internationally.

Her debut play Home Sweet Soweto Home won first prize in the BBC African Performance competition. Professor Wole Soyinka awarded Childs joint-second place in African Performance 2010 with The Coffin Factory. Both plays were produced by BBC and broadcast on the BBC World Service.
