= Esprit Calvet =

French physician and collector (1728-1810)

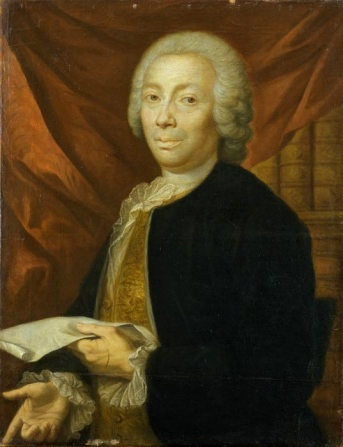
- Portrait of Calvet, by Philippe Sauvan (c. 1778)
- Born: November 28, 1728; Avignon, Vaucluse, France
- Died: July 25, 1810 (aged 81)
- Education: Avignon University; Montpellier University; Paris University
- Occupations: Physician, collector

Esprit Calvet (French pronunciation: [ɛspʁi kalvɛ]; 28 November 1728 – 25 July 1810) was a French physician and collector.

Calvet came from a long established family in Avignon and was educated at the Jesuit college in the town. He studied medicine at the university in Avignon, in Montpellier and then in Paris. He returned to Avignon and became the first Professor of Medicine at the university. He eventually became the chief doctor of the Hôpitaux Sainte-Marte.

In his last will, dated 10 January 1810, Calvet donated his cabinet of curiosities, his library and a few pictures to the town of Avignon. The donation was accepted by Napoleon I in a decree dated 9 April 1811. The collection is housed in the Musee Calvert on rue Joseph Vernet in Avignon.

== See also ==
- Fondation Calvet

== Sources ==
- Girard, Joseph (1955). Histoire du Musée Calvet (PDF) (in French). Avignon: Musée Calvet. OCLC 47144404. (Originally published as: Girard, Joseph (1954). "Histoire du Musée Calvet". Provence Historique. 4: 5–130.)
