= Júlia Hajdú =

Hungarian composer and pianist (1925–1987)

- Born: 25 September 1925; Budapest, Kingdom of Hungary
- Died: 23 October 1987 (aged 62); Budapest, Hungarian People's Republic
- Burial place: Farkasréti Cemetery
- Occupations: Composer, pianist
- Spouse: István Pajor (m. 1946; died 1973)

Júlia Hajdú (8 September 1925 – 23 October 1987) was a Hungarian composer and pianist known for her light music compositions, and is considered to be the first female Hungarian operetta writer. She was also known for writing the song "Pest megér egy estet" (Pest is Worth a Night) and co-founding and contributing to Magyar Televízió.

== Early life and education ==
Júlia Hajdú was born into a Jewish family in Budapest on 8 September 1925. Her father was a journalist, and her family owned an amusement park in Budapest called "English Park". Hajdú would later state that her love of operettas began when her parents took her to watch Denevér (The Bat) at the theatre when she was aged four.

Her first foray into a musical career came when she was twelve, when one of her songs was played on the radio. She attended the Budapest Academy of Music, where she was tutored in folk music by Zoltán Kodály and composition and instrumentation with György Ránki. She was also taught orchestration by Pál Kadosa. Hajdú ultimately graduated from the academy with honours as a piano teacher.

== Career ==
Before composing full-time, Hajdú worked as a journalist for the daily newspaper Vilag. However, she stopped working there in 1949 after she began to have success with her music career.

According to Hajdú, the Medgyaszay Theater was among the first venues where her compositions were performed, where they were positively received. In 1948, she won a dance song composition contest with her song "Van annak aki el nem issza" (Those Have It, Who Do Not Spend It on Drinking). The popularity of the song led her to be named the "first female hit writer" in Hungary. During this time, she also achieved success with the songs "Mexikói lány" (Mexico Girl) and "Száz édes csók" (One Hundred Sweet Kisses), the former of which was sung by Katalin Karády. Another of her most popular songs was "Pest megér egy estet" (Pest is Worth a Night).

Despite her success, Hajdú struggled to have her work published and as publishers were not interested in releasing pieces by female composers. As a result, she had to finance the recording of her first composition herself. She would later credit television for creating more opportunities for women composers. In 1957, she co-founded Magyar Televízió, and was one of its most productive contributors to its entertainment shows until her death.

Hajdú primarily composed light music, especially operettas, becoming the first female Hungarian operetta composer. Some of her operettas include "Füredi komédiások", "Végzetes menyasszony" (Fatal Bride) and "Doktor kisasszony" (Miss Doctor), the former of which was performed at one theatre 150 times. She also wrote "Majális" (Mayfair) based on the life of artist Pál Szinyei Merse. Hajdú also collaborated with Elek Kaszó and Miklós Tóth to co-write "Dunántúli Színjátszó Társaság" (Transdanubian Theater Company) inspired by Hungarian theatre. She later stated that other composers "stealing" her work was the source of her greatest pride.

During her career, she collaborated with various Hungarian entertainers including Mária Mezei, Sándor Svéd and Mihály Székely. She also worked as singer and actress Hanna Honthy's pianist and accompanied her on tours abroad including Canada and the United States.

== Personal life and death ==
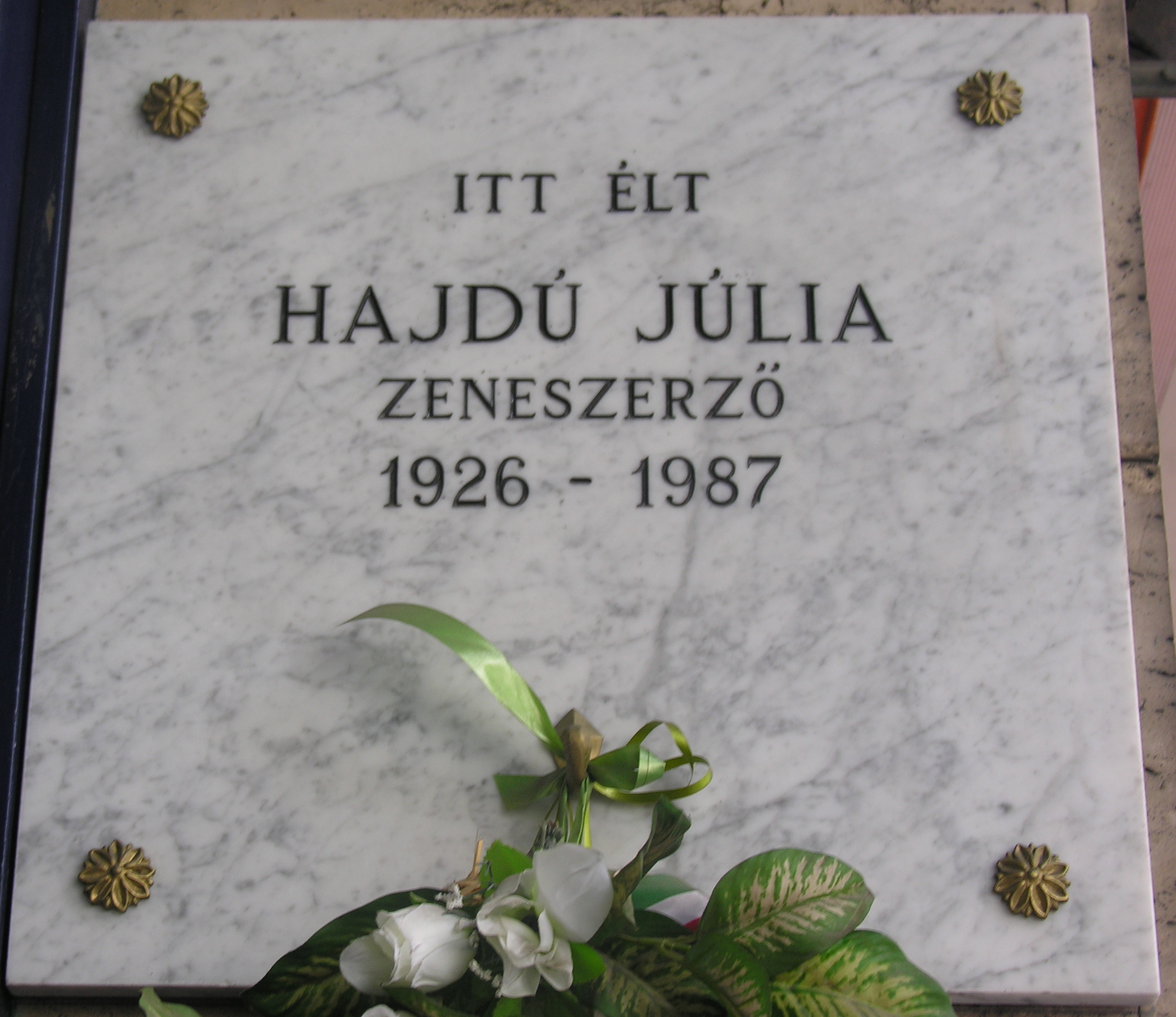
Commemorative plaque of Júlia Hajdú in Budapest District XIII, Pozsonyi Street No 7

She married actor and announcer István Pajor in 1946. She was Pajor's third wife.

Hajdú died in Budapest on 23 October 1987, at the age of 62. She was buried at Farkasréti Cemetery.

== Works ==
The number of operettas Hajdú composed over her career is disputed, but is thought to be either 14 or 26. Selected works include:

- Csak a szépre emlékezem (I Only Remember the Good Times)

Her works have been recorded and issued on CD, including:

- Evergreen Melodies (April 22, 2003) Hungaroton, ASIN: B00008ZL87

== Sources ==
- Lengyel, Emese (22 July 2024). "Júlia Hajdu (1925–1987) – Career of a woman operetta composer". Hungarian Studies. 37 (2). doi:10.1556/044.2023.00253. ISSN 1588-2772.
