= Júlia Calvet =

Spanish politician (born 2001)

- Calvet in 2024

Member of the Parliament of Catalonia
- Incumbent
- Assumed office 10 June 2024
- Constituency: Barcelona

Personal details
- Born: 2001 (age 24–25)
- Party: Vox

Júlia Calvet Puig (born 2001) is a Spanish politician serving as a member of the Parliament of Catalonia since 2024. She has served as national spokesperson for youth policy of Vox since 2025. From 2021 to 2024, she served as president of S'ha Acabat!.
