= Athletics at the 1956 Summer Olympics – Men's pole vault =

Men's pole vault at the Games of the XVI Olympiad
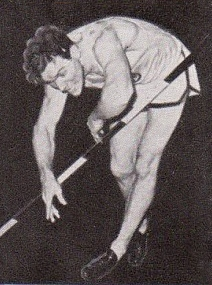
- Bob Richards (1950s)
- Venue: Olympic Park Stadium
- Dates: 24 November 1956 (qualifying); 26 November 1956 (final)
- Competitors: 19 from 12 nations
- Winning height: 4.56 OR

Medalists
| 1st place, gold medalist(s) | | Bob Richards; United States |
| 2nd place, silver medalist(s) | | Bob Gutowski; United States |
| 3rd place, bronze medalist(s) | | Georgios Roubanis; Greece |

Pathe Highlights

The men's pole vault was an event at the 1956 Summer Olympics in Melbourne, Australia. Nineteen athletes from 12 nations competed. The maximum number of athletes per nation had been set at 3 since the 1930 Olympic Congress. The final was held on the third day of the track and field competition, on Monday November 26, 1956. The event was won by Bob Richards of the United States, the nation's 13th consecutive victory in the event. Richards was the first (and, through 2016, only) man to successfully defend Olympic gold in the pole vault; he was also the first (and, through 2016, only) man to win three total medals in the event. For the second straight Games, the American team went 1–2, this time with Bob Gutowski taking silver. Georgios Roubanis's bronze was Greece's first pole vault medal since 1896, and Greece's first Olympic medal overall since 1920.

== Summary ==
Bob Richards entered the competition as the defending champion and the best in the world, though he never managed to beat Dutch Warmerdam's world record of 4.77 m (15 ft 7 3/4 in) set back in 1942 throughout his career. Richards stayed in first place throughout the competition, with a first attempt clearance at every height up to 4.53m. It was not as easy for him in the qualifying round when Richards struggled at 4.00, well below his normal opening height, missing his first two attempts before clearing it on his last. By 4.35, there were only four athletes left; the three Americans George Mattos, Bob Gutowski and Richards, and UCLA trained Greek athlete Georgios Roubanis using a fiberglass pole in major international competition for the first time. Mattos was unable to get over 4.40m and the medalists were settled. All three cleared 4.50m on their first attempt, though by that point, Roubanis had two misses a lower heights and Gutowski had four. At 4.53m, again Gutowski and Richards cleared on their first attempt, but Roubanis couldn't get over the bar and had to settle for bronze. At 4.56 m (14 ft 11 1/2 in), Richards cleared it on his second attempt after his first miss of the competition. When Gutowski was unable to get over the height, Richards confirmed his title defense. No other man has ever defended the Olympic pole vault title, though Yelena Isinbayeva did defend the women's title in 2008 and several men returned to the Olympics to achieve silver after their gold. Richards was rewarded by being the face of Wheaties on their cereal box and was their spokesman until 1976 when Bruce Jenner became the next Olympic hero on the box. The following year, it was Gutowski who finally broke Warmerdam's record using a steel pole. Gutowski finished fourth at the 1956 Olympic Trials and only received his spot in Melbourne after Jim Graham was forced to withdraw with an injury.

== Background ==
This was the 13th appearance of the event, which is one of 12 athletics events to have been held at every Summer Olympics. The returning finalists from the 1952 Games were gold medalist Bob Richards of the United States, bronze medalist Ragnar Lundberg of Sweden, and ninth-place finisher George Mattos of the United States. Richards was the favorite to repeat; he had won the AAU championships in 1948, 1949, 1950, 1951, 1952, 1954, 1955, and 1956, and the Pan-American championship in 1951 and 1955. Others expecting to content were Richard's teammates (Bob Gutowski and Mattos), as well as the 1950 and 1954 European champions, Lundberg and Eeles Landström respectively.

Australia and Pakistan each made their first appearance in the event; Germany competed as the "United Team of Germany" for the first time. The United States made its 13th appearance, the only nation to have competed at every Olympic men's pole vault to that point.

== Competition format ==
The competition used the two-round format introduced in 1912, with results cleared between rounds. Vaulters received three attempts at each height. Ties were broken by the countback rule; at the time, total attempts was used after total misses.

In the qualifying round, the bar was set at 3.70 metres, 3.85 metres, 4.00 metres, 4.10 metres, and 4.15 metres. All vaulters clearing 4.15 metres advanced to the final.

In the final, the bar was set at 3.70 metres, increased by 5 centimetres at a time until 4.50 metres, then by 3 centimetres at a time.

== Records ==
Prior to this competition, the existing world and Olympic records were as follows.

| World record | Cornelius Warmerdam (USA) | 4.77 | Modesto, United States | 23 May 1942 |
| Olympic record | Bob Richards (USA) | 4.55 | Helsinki, Finland | 22 July 1952 |

Bob Richards beat his own Olympic record by a centimetre, winning with 4.56 metres.

== Schedule ==
All times are Australian Eastern Standard Time (UTC+10)

| Date | Time | Round |
|---|---|---|
| Saturday, 24 November 1956 | 10:00 | Qualifying |
| Monday, 26 November 1956 | 13:30 | Final |

== Results ==
Key

- o = Height cleared
- x = Height failed
- – = Height passed
- r = Retired
- SB = Season's best
- PB = Personal best
- NR = National record
- AR = Area record
- OR = Olympic record
- WR = World record
- WL = World lead
- NM = No mark
- DNS = Did not start
- DQ = Disqualified

=== Qualifying ===
All athletes passed at 4.10 metres.

| Rank | Athlete | Nation | 3.70 | 3.85 | 4.00 | 4.15 | Height | Notes |
|---|---|---|---|---|---|---|---|---|
| 1 | George Mattos | United States | — | o | — | o | 4.15 | Q |
| 2 | Vladimir Bulatov | Soviet Union | — | o | o | o | 4.15 | Q |
| 2 | Giulio Chiesa | Italy | — | o | o | o | 4.15 | Q |
| 2 | Zbigniew Janiszewski | Poland | — | o | o | o | 4.15 | Q |
| 5 | Ragnar Lundberg | Sweden | o | o | o | o | 4.15 | Q |
| 5 | Georgios Roubanis | Greece | o | o | o | o | 4.15 | Q |
| 7 | Bob Gutowski | United States | xo | — | — | o | 4.15 | Q |
| 8 | Vitaliy Chernobai | Soviet Union | — | xo | o | o | 4.15 | Q |
| 8 | Zenon Ważny | Poland | — | xo | o | o | 4.15 | Q |
| 8 | Anatoly Petrov | Soviet Union | — | o | xo | o | 4.15 | Q |
| 11 | Bob Richards | United States | — | o | xxo | o | 4.15 | Q |
| 12 | Eeles Landström | Finland | o | o | o | xo | 4.15 | Q |
| 12 | Manfred Preußger | United Team of Germany | o | o | o | xo | 4.15 | Q |
| 12 | Matti Sutinen | Finland | o | o | o | xo | 4.15 | Q |
| 15 | Allah Ditta | Pakistan | — | xxo | xo | xxx | 4.00 | |
| 16 | Rolando Cruz | Puerto Rico | o | o | xxo | xxx | 4.00 | |
| 17 | Bruce Peever | Australia | o | o | xxx | —N/a | 3.85 | |
| 18 | Peter Denton | Australia | xo | o | xxx | —N/a | 3.85 | |
| — | Victor Sillon | France | — | x-- | —N/a | | No mark | |

=== Final ===
Sutinen failed to make a successful jump in the final. All finalists passed all heights below 4.00 metres.

| Rank | Athlete | Nation | 4.00 | 4.15 | 4.25 | 4.35 | 4.40 | 4.45 | 4.50 | 4.53 | 4.56 | 4.59 | Height | Notes |
|---|---|---|---|---|---|---|---|---|---|---|---|---|---|---|
| 1st place, gold medalist(s) | Bob Richards | United States | o | o | o | o | o | o | o | o | xo | xxx | 4.56 m | OR |
| 2nd place, silver medalist(s) | Bob Gutowski | United States | o | o | o | xo | xo | xxo | o | o | xxx | —N/a | 4.53 | |
| 3rd place, bronze medalist(s) | Georgios Roubanis | Greece | o | o | xo | xo | o | o | o | xxx | —N/a | | 4.50 | |
| 4 | George Mattos | United States | o | — | o | o | xxx | —N/a | | | | | 4.35 | |
| 5 | Ragnar Lundberg | Sweden | o | — | o | xxx | —N/a | | | | | | 4.25 | |
| 6 | Zenon Ważny | Poland | o | o | o | xxx | —N/a | | | | | | 4.25 | |
| 7 | Eeles Landström | Finland | o | — | xo | xxx | —N/a | | | | | | 4.25 | |
| 8 | Manfred Preußger | United Team of Germany | o | xo | xo | xxx | —N/a | | | | | | 4.25 | |
| 9 | Vladimir Bulatov | Soviet Union | xo | o | xxx | —N/a | | | | | | | 4.15 | |
| 9 | Giulio Chiesa | Italy | xo | o | xxx | —N/a | | | | | | | 4.15 | |
| 11 | Anatoly Petrov | Soviet Union | o | xo | xxx | —N/a | | | | | | | 4.15 | |
| 12 | Zbigniew Janiszewski | Poland | xo | xo | xxx | —N/a | | | | | | | 4.15 | |
| 13 | Vitaliy Chernobai | Soviet Union | o | xxx | —N/a | | | | | | | | 4.00 | |
| — | Matti Sutinen | Finland | xxx | —N/a | | | | | | | | | No mark | |
