= 1958 European Athletics Championships – Men's pole vault =

Men's pole vault at the European Athletics Championships

The men's pole vault at the 1958 European Athletics Championships was held in Stockholm, Sweden, at Stockholms Olympiastadion on 21 and 22 August 1958.

== Medalists ==
Gold	Eeles Landström; Finland
Silver	Manfred Preußger; East Germany
Bronze	Vladimir Bulatov; Soviet Union

== Results ==
=== Final ===
22 August

Rank	Name	Nationality	Result	Notes
1st place, gold medalist(s)	Eeles Landström	Finland	4.50	CR
2nd place, silver medalist(s)	Manfred Preußger	East Germany	4.50	CR
3rd place, bronze medalist(s)	Vladimir Bulatov	Soviet Union	4.50	CR
4	Lennart Lind	Sweden	4.40	
5	Zenon Ważny	Poland	4.30	
6	Vitaliy Chernobay	Soviet Union	4.30	
7	Leon Lukman	Yugoslavia	4.30	
8	Peter Laufer	East Germany	4.30	
9	Roman Lešek	Yugoslavia	4.30	
10	Andrzej Krzesiński	Poland	4.20	
10	Ragnar Lundberg	Sweden	4.20	
12	János Horváth	Hungary	4.20	
13	Edmondo Ballotta	Italy	4.20	
14	Valbjörn Þorláksson	Iceland	4.20	
15	Victor Sillon	France	4.20	
15	Andreas Larsen-Nyhus	Norway	4.20	
17	Geoffrey Elliott	Great Britain	4.15	
18	Georgios Roubanis	Greece	4.10	
19	Matti Sutinen	Finland	4.00	
19	Rigas Efstatiadis	Greece	4.00	
21	Paul Coppejans	Belgium	4.00	

=== Qualification ===
21 August

Rank	Name	Nationality	Result	Notes
	Valbjörn Þorláksson	Iceland	4.15	Q
	Victor Sillon	France	4.15	Q
	Geoffrey Elliott	Great Britain	4.15	Q
	Zenon Ważny	Poland	4.15	Q
	Andrzej Krzesiński	Poland	4.15	Q
	Matti Sutinen	Finland	4.15	Q
	Georgios Roubanis	Greece	4.15	Q
	Ragnar Lundberg	Sweden	4.15	Q
	Andreas Larsen-Nyhus	Norway	4.15	Q
	Edmondo Ballotta	Italy	4.15	Q
	Paul Coppejans	Belgium	4.15	Q
	János Horváth	Hungary	4.15	Q
	Manfred Preußger	East Germany	4.15	Q
	Peter Laufer	East Germany	4.15	Q
	Rigas Efstatiadis	Greece	4.15	Q
	Lennart Lind	Sweden	4.15	Q
	Vladimir Bulatov	Soviet Union	4.15	Q
	Eeles Landström	Finland	4.15	Q
	Vitaliy Chernobay	Soviet Union	4.15	Q
	Roman Lešek	Yugoslavia	4.15	Q
	Leon Lukman	Yugoslavia	4.15	Q
	Richard Larsen	Denmark	4.00	
	Heiðar Georgsson	Iceland	3.80	
	Bernard Balastre	France	3.80	
	Josef Bauer	Austria	3.80	
	Raymond Van Dijck	Belgium	3.80	

== Participation ==
According to an unofficial count, 26 athletes from 16 countries participated in the event.

- Austria (1)
- Belgium (2)
- Denmark (1)
- East Germany (2)
- Finland (2)
- France (2)
- Greece (2)
- Hungary (1)
- Iceland (2)
- Italy (1)
- Norway (1)
- Poland (2)
- Soviet Union (2)
- Sweden (2)
- Great Britain (1)
- Yugoslavia (2)
