= 1962 European Athletics Championships – Men's pole vault =

Men's pole vault at the European Athletics Championships

The men's pole vault at the 1962 European Athletics Championships was held in Belgrade, then Yugoslavia, at JNA Stadium on 13 and 15 September 1962.

Just before the meeting, the IAAF council approved the optional use of glass fibre poles.

== Medalists ==
Gold	Pentti Nikula; Finland
Silver	Rudolf Tomášek; Czechoslovakia
Bronze	Kauko Nyström; Finland

== Results ==
=== Final ===
15 September

Rank	Name	Nationality	Result	Notes
1st place, gold medalist(s)	Pentti Nikula	Finland	4.80	CR
2nd place, silver medalist(s)	Rudolf Tomášek	Czechoslovakia	4.60	
3rd place, bronze medalist(s)	Kauko Nyström	Finland	4.60	
4	Risto Ankio	Finland	4.55	
5	Maurice Houvion	France	4.55	
6	Roman Lešek	Yugoslavia	4.55	NR
7	Günter Malcher	East Germany	4.50	
8	Manfred Preußger	East Germany	4.50	
9	Bernard Balastre	France	4.50	
10	Ihor Petrenko	Soviet Union	4.40	
11	Petre Astafei	Romania	4.40	
12	Kjell Hovik	Norway	4.40	
13	Klaus Lehnertz	West Germany	4.30	
14	Janusz Gronowski	Poland	4.30	

=== Qualification ===
13 September

Rank	Name	Nationality	Result	Notes
	Janusz Gronowski	Poland	4.40	Q
	Klaus Lehnertz	West Germany	4.40	Q
	Maurice Houvion	France	4.40	Q
	Günter Malcher	East Germany	4.40	Q
	Kauko Nyström	Finland	4.40	Q
	Ihor Petrenko	Soviet Union	4.40	Q
	Risto Ankio	Finland	4.40	Q
	Kjell Hovik	Norway	4.40	Q
	Roman Lešek	Yugoslavia	4.40	Q
	Bernard Balastre	France	4.40	Q
	Manfred Preußger	East Germany	4.40	Q
	Petre Astafei	Romania	4.40	Q
	Rudolf Tomášek	Czechoslovakia	4.40	Q
	Pentti Nikula	Finland	4.40	Q
	Gérard Barras	Switzerland	4.30	
	Mirko Kuzmanović	Yugoslavia	4.30	
	Dimitar Khlebarov	Bulgaria	4.30	
	Mikael Schie	Norway	4.20	
	Franc Rojko	Yugoslavia	4.20	
	Reidulv Førde	Norway	4.20	
	Christos Papanikolaou	Greece	4.20	
	Valbjörn Þorláksson	Iceland	4.10	
	Roland Gras	France	4.00	

== Participation ==
According to an unofficial count, 23 athletes from 14 countries participated in the event.

- Bulgaria (1)
- Czechoslovakia (1)
- East Germany (2)
- Finland (3)
- France (3)
- Greece (1)
- Iceland (1)
- Norway (3)
- Poland (1)
- Romania (1)
- Soviet Union (1)
- Switzerland (1)
- West Germany (1)
- Yugoslavia (3)
