= Athletics at the 1960 Summer Olympics – Men's pole vault =

Men's pole vault at the Games of the XVII Olympiad
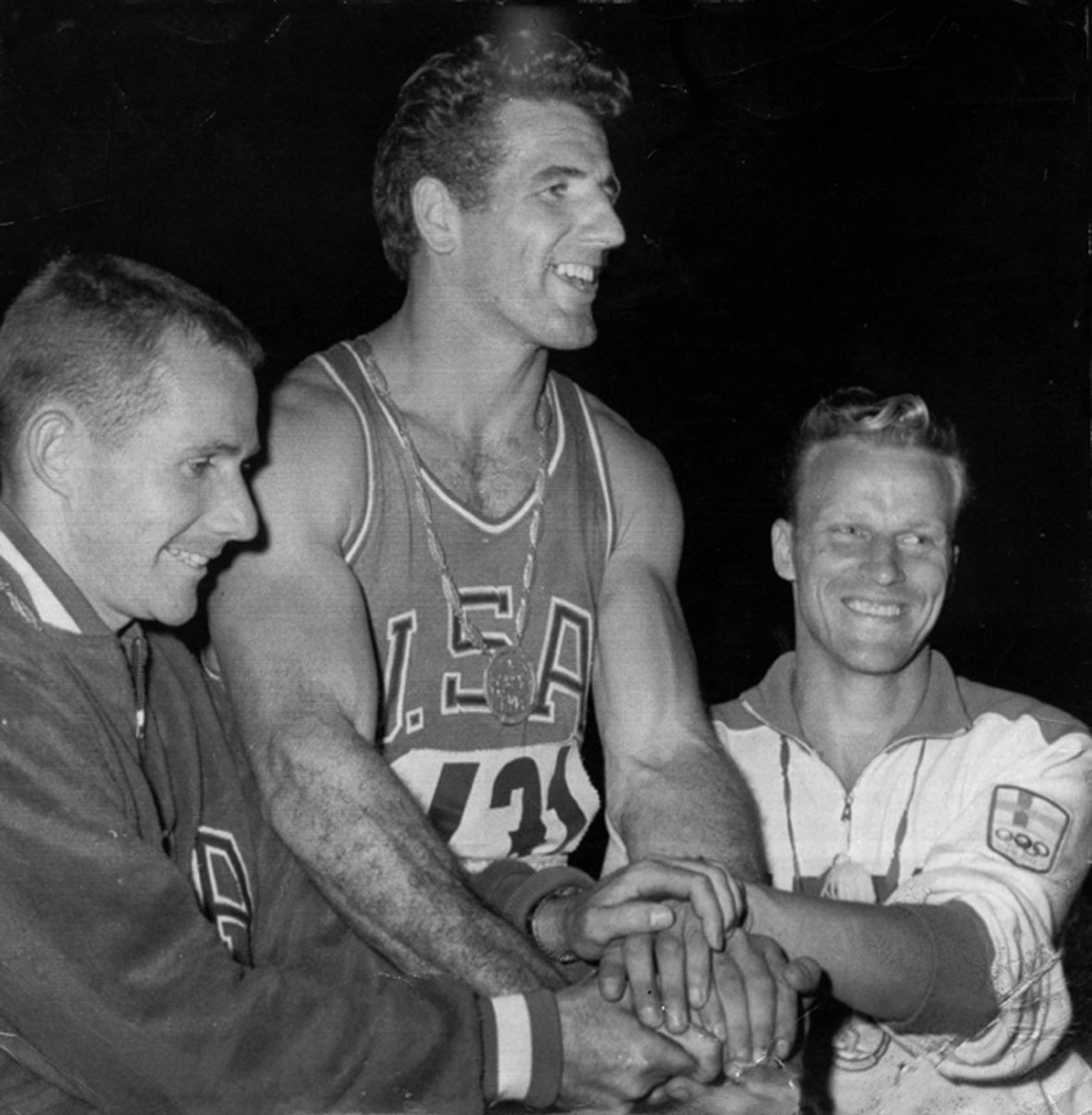
- Left-right: Ron Morris, Don Bragg, Eeles Landström
- Venue: Olympic Stadium
- Dates: September 5, 1960 (qualifying round); September 7, 1960 (final)
- Competitors: 29 from 20 nations
- Winning height: 4.70 OR

Medalists
| 1st place, gold medalist(s) | | Don Bragg; United States |
| 2nd place, silver medalist(s) | | Ron Morris; United States |
| 3rd place, bronze medalist(s) | | Eeles Landström; Finland |

The men's pole vault field event at the 1960 Olympic Games took place on September 5 and September 7. Twenty-nine athletes from 20 nations competed. The maximum number of athletes per nation had been set at 3 since the 1930 Olympic Congress. The event was won by Don Bragg of the United States, the nation's 14th consecutive victory in the men's pole vault. Ron Morris took silver, making it three straight Games the American team had finished 1–2. Eeles Landström's bronze was Finland's first medal in the event since 1948.

== Background ==
This was the 14th appearance of the event, which is one of 12 athletics events to have been held at every Summer Olympics. The returning finalists from the 1956 Games were bronze medalist Georgios Roubanis of Greece, seventh-place finisher Eeles Landström of Finland, eighth-place finisher Manfred Preußger of the United Team of Germany, and fourteenth-place finisher Matti Sutinen of Finland. Ninth-place finisher Vladimir Bulatov of the Soviet Union was entered and expected to contend (he was ranked 5th in the world in 1959), but broke his ankle in warm-ups. Don Bragg of the United States was the favorite after breaking the world record at the U.S. trials.

Bulgaria, Iraq, Nigeria, and Turkey each made their first appearance in the event; Germany competed as the "United Team of Germany" for the first time. The United States made its 14th appearance, the only nation to have competed at every Olympic men's pole vault to that point.

== Competition format ==
The competition used the two-round format introduced in 1912, with results cleared between rounds. Vaulters received three attempts at each height. Ties were broken by the countback rule. At the time, total attempts was used after total misses.

In the qualifying round, the bar was set at 3.80 metres, 4.00 metres, 4.20 metres, 4.30 metres, and 4.40 metres. All vaulters clearing 4.40 metres advanced to the final. If fewer than 12 cleared that height, the top 12 (including ties) advanced.

In the final, the bar was set at 4.00 metres, 4.20 metres, 4.30 metres, 4.50 metres, 4.55 metres, 4.60 metres, and 4.70 metres; the winner could attempt further height to break a record.

== Records ==
Prior to this competition, the existing world and Olympic records were as follows.

| World record | Don Bragg (USA) | 4.80 | Palo Alto, United States | 2 July 1960 |
| Olympic record | Bob Richards (USA) | 4.56 | Melbourne, Australia | 26 November 1956 |

Don Bragg and Ron Morris beat the Olympic record, clearing 4.60 metres. Bragg was also successful at 4.70 metres, setting the new mark.

== Schedule ==
All times are Central European Time (UTC+1)

| Date | Time | Round |
|---|---|---|
| Monday, 5 September 1960 | 9:00 | Qualifying |
| Wednesday, 7 September 1960 | 13:30 | Final |

== Results ==
Key

- o = Height cleared
- x = Height failed
- – = Height passed
- r = Retired
- SB = Season's best
- PB = Personal best
- NR = National record
- AR = Area record
- OR = Olympic record
- WR = World record
- WL = World lead
- NM = No mark
- DNS = Did not start
- DQ = Disqualified

Top twelve jumpers and ties and all jumpers reaching 4.40 metres advanced to the finals. All heights are listed in metres.

=== Qualifying ===
| Rank | Athlete | Nation | 3.80 | 4.00 | 4.20 | 4.30 | 4.40 | Height | Notes |
|---|---|---|---|---|---|---|---|---|---|
| 1 | Khristo Khristov | Bulgaria | — | o | o | o | o | 4.40 | Q |
| 1 | Matti Sutinen | Finland | — | o | o | o | o | 4.40 | Q |
| 3 | Don Bragg | United States | — | — | o | xo | o | 4.40 | Q |
| 4 | Eeles Landström | Finland | — | o | o | xo | o | 4.40 | Q |
| 4 | Günter Malcher | United Team of Germany | — | o | xo | o | o | 4.40 | Q |
| 6 | Rudolf Tomášek | Czechoslovakia | o | xo | o | o | o | 4.40 | Q |
| 7 | Leon Lukman | Yugoslavia | — | o | xxo | o | o | 4.40 | Q |
| 8 | Rolando Cruz | Puerto Rico | — | o | o | o | xxo | 4.40 | Q |
| 8 | Ihor Petrenko | Soviet Union | — | o | o | o | xxo | 4.40 | Q |
| 10 | Jānis Krasovskis | Soviet Union | — | — | o | xo | xxo | 4.40 | Q |
| 11 | Ron Morris | United States | — | — | o | o | xxx | 4.30 | q |
| 12 | Dimitar Khlebarov | Bulgaria | — | o | o | o | xxx | 4.30 | q |
| 12 | Andrzej Krzesiński | Poland | — | o | o | o | xxx | 4.30 | q |
| 14 | Peter Laufer | United Team of Germany | — | o | o | — | xxx | 4.20 | |
| 14 | Manfred Preußger | United Team of Germany | — | o | o | — | xxx | 4.20 | |
| 14 | Roman Lešek | Yugoslavia | — | o | o | xxx | —N/a | 4.20 | |
| 14 | Valbjörn Þorláksson | Iceland | — | o | o | xxx | —N/a | 4.20 | |
| 18 | Dave Clark | United States | o | o | o | xxx | —N/a | 4.20 | |
| 18 | Janusz Gronowski | Poland | o | o | o | xxx | —N/a | 4.20 | |
| 18 | Georgios Roubanis | Greece | o | o | o | xxx | —N/a | 4.20 | |
| 18 | Victor Sillon | France | o | o | o | xxx | —N/a | 4.20 | |
| 22 | Noriaki Yasuda | Japan | — | xxo | o | xxx | —N/a | 4.20 | |
| 23 | Bjørn Andersen | Denmark | — | o | xxx | —N/a | | 4.00 | |
| 23 | Gérard Barras | Switzerland | — | o | xxx | —N/a | | 4.00 | |
| 23 | Raymond Van Dijck | Belgium | — | o | xxx | —N/a | | 4.00 | |
| 26 | Allah Ditta | Pakistan | xo | o | xxx | —N/a | | 4.00 | |
| — | Owen Okundaye | Nigeria | xxx | —N/a | | | | No mark | |
| — | Mohamed Abdullah | Iraq | xxx | —N/a | | | | No mark | |
| — | Orhan Altan | Turkey | xxx | —N/a | | | | No mark | |
| — | Vladimir Bulatov | Soviet Union | DNS | | | | | | |
| — | Günther Gratzer | Austria | DNS | | | | | | |

=== Final ===
| Rank | Athlete | Nation | 4.00 | 4.20 | 4.30 | 4.40 | 4.50 | 4.55 | 4.60 | 4.70 | 4.82 | Height | Notes |
|---|---|---|---|---|---|---|---|---|---|---|---|---|---|
| 1st place, gold medalist(s) | Don Bragg | United States | — | — | o | xo | o | o | o | o | xxx | 4.70 | OR |
| 2nd place, silver medalist(s) | Ron Morris | United States | — | — | o | o | xo | o | xo | xxx | —N/a | 4.60 | |
| 3rd place, bronze medalist(s) | Eeles Landström | Finland | — | o | — | xo | xo | o | xxx | —N/a | | 4.55 | |
| 4 | Rolando Cruz | Puerto Rico | o | o | o | o | o | xo | xxx | —N/a | | 4.55 | |
| 5 | Günter Malcher | United Team of Germany | — | o | o | o | o | xxx | —N/a | | | 4.50 | |
| 6 | Ihor Petrenko | Soviet Union | — | o | — | xxo | o | xxx | —N/a | | | 4.50 | |
| 6 | Matti Sutinen | Finland | — | o | — | xxo | o | xxx | —N/a | | | 4.50 | |
| 8 | Rudolf Tomášek | Czechoslovakia | o | o | o | xxo | o | xxx | —N/a | | | 4.50 | |
| 9 | Leon Lukman | Yugoslavia | o | o | o | o | xxx | —N/a | | | | 4.40 | |
| 10 | Khristo Khristov | Bulgaria | — | xo | o | o | xxx | —N/a | | | | 4.40 | |
| 11 | Dimitar Khlebarov | Bulgaria | — | o | o | xxx | —N/a | | | | | 4.30 | |
| 12 | Andrzej Krzesiński | Poland | o | o | o | xxx | —N/a | | | | | 4.30 | |
| 13 | Jānis Krasovskis | Soviet Union | — | — | xo | xxx | —N/a | | | | | 4.30 | |
