= Athletics at the 1961 Summer Universiade – Men's pole vault =

The men's pole vault event at the 1961 Summer Universiade was held at the Vasil Levski National Stadium in Sofia, Bulgaria, with the final on 2 September 1961.

== Medalists ==
Gold	Silver	Bronze
Dimitar Khlebarov; Bulgaria	Gérard Barras; Switzerland	Ihor Petrenko; Soviet Union

== Results ==
=== Qualifications ===
Rank	Name	Nationality	Result	Notes
	Risto Ankio	Finland	4.10	q
	Gérard Barras	Switzerland	4.10	q
	Dimitar Khlebarov	Bulgaria	4.10	q
	Khristo Khristov	Bulgaria	4.10	q
	Ihor Petrenko	Soviet Union	4.10	q
	Rudolf Tomášek	Czechoslovakia	4.10	q
	Janusz Gronowski	Poland	4.10	q
	Dragan Arapović	Yugoslavia	4.10	q
	Friedbert Volk	West Germany	4.10	q
	István Török	Hungary	4.10	q
	Helmut Schmidt	West Germany	4.10	q
	Yasushi Yamada	Japan	4.10	q
	Jonathan Hugon	Great Britain	4.00	
	Sinan Özisik	Turkey	3.80	
	Dimitriyas Vicarapalo	Turkey	3.60	

=== Final ===
Rank	Athlete	Nationality	Result	Notes
1st place, gold medalist(s)	Dimitar Khlebarov	Bulgaria	4.52	
2nd place, silver medalist(s)	Gérard Barras	Switzerland	4.52	
3rd place, bronze medalist(s)	Ihor Petrenko	Soviet Union	4.52	
4	Risto Ankio	Finland	4.46	
5	Khristo Khristov	Bulgaria	4.40	
6	Janusz Gronowski	Poland	4.40	
7	Rudolf Tomášek	Czechoslovakia	4.30	
8	István Török	Hungary	4.30	
9	Yasushi Yamada	Japan	4.20	
10	Helmut Schmidt	West Germany	4.10	
11	Friedbert Volk	West Germany	4.00	
12	Dragan Arapović	Yugoslavia	4.00	
