= George Mattos =

American pole vaulter (1929–2012)

George Mattos (October 6, 1929 – October 18, 2012) was an American pole vaulter. He competed for his native country in two Olympics, 1952 when he finished 9th and 1956 when he finished 4th, both times behind American teammate Bob Richards.

Born in Santa Cruz, California, Mattos went to Pacific Grove High School in Pacific Grove, near Monterey, California. He won the Pole Vault at the 1947 CIF California State Meet. Second place in the event was Robert Culp, from Berkeley High School, who went on to become an actor, starring in the TV show I-Spy among other accomplishments. Next Mattos went to San Jose State College, where he was coached by Hall of Famer Bud Winter. He tied for second place at the NCAA Men's Outdoor Track and Field Championship in both 1950 and in 1951.

Competing for the San Francisco Olympic Club at the 1952 Olympic Trials, Mattos finished third behind Richards and Don Laz (equalling Laz' height at 4.40m but losing on fewer misses). Those two would finish in that order at the Olympics, while Mattos only managed 4.20 and finished 9th.

In 1953, competing for the U.S. Army, Mattos tied Laz to win the USA Outdoor Track and Field Championships. The Army notation might be in error as Mattos competed for the U.S. Air Force at the 1956 Olympic Trials. This proved to be a highly competitive trials as seven competitors all equalled the trials record at 4.48m. At the next height, a new record, only Mattos and Richards survived but Laz, Bob Gutowski and Ron Morris all knocked the bar off with their poles (a critical rule at the time), rather than the normal failure to clear the bar. While Gutowski finished 4th, he replaced the injured Jim Graham on the Olympic team that went to the Olympics in December that year. Gutowski finished second behind Richards in the Olympics. Mattos jumped only 4.35 at the Olympics, but only Georgios Roubanis, a Greek UCLA student kept Mattos from completing an American sweep of the event.

Mattos finished amongst the top 6 at the American championships for ten years in a row, 1950–1959.
