= Athletics at the 1959 Pan American Games – Men's pole vault =

Men's pole vault at the Pan American Games

The men's pole vault event at the 1959 Pan American Games was held at the Soldier Field in Chicago on 29 August.

== Results ==
Rank	Name	Nationality	Result	Notes
1st place, gold medalist(s)	Don Bragg	United States	4.62	
2nd place, silver medalist(s)	Jim Graham	United States	4.32	
3rd place, bronze medalist(s)	Rolando Cruz	Puerto Rico	4.32	
4	Ron Morris	United States	4.32	
5	Rubén Cruz	Puerto Rico	4.25	
6	Bob Reid	Canada	4.05	
7	David Linekin	Canada	4.05	
8	José Infante	Chile	3.80	
8	Brígido Iriarte	Venezuela	3.80	
8	Miguel Rivera	Puerto Rico	3.80	
11	Fausto de Souza	Brazil	3.80	
12	Tomotsu Nishida	Brazil	3.80	
	Wilf Foss	Canada	DNS	
