= Diane Bragg =

American pole vaulter

Diane Bragg is an American pole vaulter. On July 6, 1952 she jumped 8 ft 6 in (2.59 m) at a meet in Philadelphia to improve upon Zoya Romanova's world record in the pole vault. Romanova had held the world record for over 16 years. Bragg's record was equalled more than 16 years later by Brenda Walker, but it wasn't for an additional decade before her record was marginally beaten by Irene Spieker. Additionally, Spieker set her mark indoors. At the time the IAAF, the world governing body, did not officially ratify records in the pole vault, but until 2000, an indoor mark would not count as an outdoor world record though Spieker's record has been logged in the world record progression. More than 30 years after Bragg's record, in 1983 Jana Edwards was finally credited with an outdoor pole vault superior to Bragg's.

Bragg was the younger sister of Don Bragg, the American pole vaulter who would go on to win the Olympic gold medal in 1960. As her brother began to excel in the pole vault, little sister would tag along at practice and learned how to vault herself in her vegetable garden.
