= Anatoly Petrov =

Anatoly Petrov may refer to:

- Anatoly Petrov (athlete)
- Anatoly Petrov (animator)
