= Don Bragg (pole vaulter) =

American pole vaulter (1935–2019)

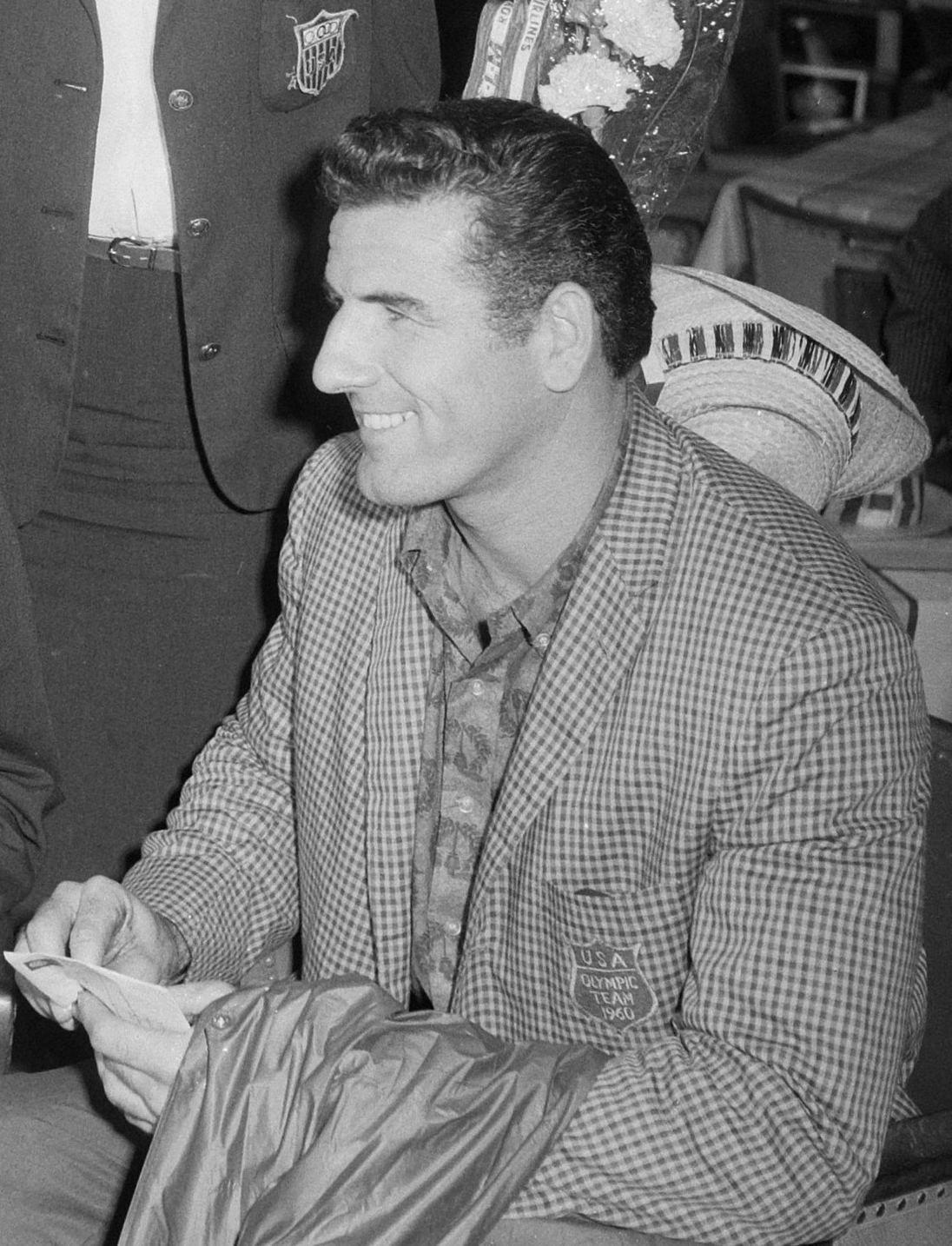
- Don Bragg in 1960

Personal information
- Born: May 15, 1935 Penns Grove, New Jersey, U.S.
- Died: February 16, 2019 (aged 83) Oakley, California, U.S.
- Height: 1.90 m (6 ft 3 in)
- Weight: 89 kg (196 lb)

Sport
- Sport: Pole vaulting
- Club: Villanova Wildcats
Medal record
Representing the United States
Olympic Games
Gold medal – first place	1960 Rome	Pole vault
Pan American Games
Gold medal – first place	1959 Chicago	Pole vault

Donald George Bragg (May 15, 1935 – February 16, 2019) was an American athlete who competed mainly in the pole vault and won a gold medal in that event at the 1960 Summer Olympics.

== Life ==
Bragg grew up in Penns Grove, New Jersey, where he attended Penns Grove High School.

Bragg was the last of the great pole vaulters to use an aluminum pole. From 1954 until 1960, he was always world ranked and capped a championship career in 1960 by setting a world record of 15' 9 1/4" (4.80 m) at the Olympic Trials and winning an Olympic gold medal with a vault of 15 ft 5 in (4.70 m). He set a world indoor record of 15' 9 1/2" (4.81 m) at Philadelphia in 1959 and, like Hall of Famer Cornelius Warmerdam, vaulted better indoors than outdoors.

At 6' 3" and 197 pounds, Bragg was one of the largest vaulters in history. He had to stay on a 1,200-calorie (5,000 kJ) diet to stay at that weight — any more and the aluminum alloy poles would crumple under the strain. The aluminum pole had another disadvantage: While taking it aboard a train in Philadelphia, Bragg hit an electrical line and was nearly electrocuted.

While at Villanova University, he won the NCAA pole vault championship in 1955 and was the IC4A champion, both indoors and outdoors, from 1955 to 1957. He also tied for the AAU indoor championship. After graduating in 1957, Bragg again tied for the AAU indoor championship in 1958, then won the event from 1959 through 1961. He was also the AAU outdoor champion in 1959.

Nicknamed "Tarzan" because of his size and strength, Bragg's goal was to play that role in the movies. Few have so actively pursued a role. He toured Europe and Africa for the U.S. Department of State as a goodwill ambassador, climbing trees and swinging from vines. He met Johnny Weissmuller, who agreed that Bragg would be perfect as Tarzan. When he won the gold at the 1960 Olympics he did the infamous Tarzan yell from the podium, shocking the crowd. He was offered the role twice, but was injured and missed both opportunities. His dream went unfulfilled.

He later became athletic director at Stockton State College in New Jersey, the owner of a summer camp, and the author of A Chance to Dare: The Don Bragg Story. His time running a summer camp is chronicled in Kamp Olympik by Don and Theresa Bragg, as told to Patricia Doherty.

In August 2010, Bragg made a speech in Rome at a ceremony commemorating the fiftieth anniversary of the 1960 Summer Olympics. He concluded this speech with his Tarzan yell.

His younger sister, Diane Bragg, also learned how to pole vault by watching her brother. In 1952, long before women were pole vaulting competitively, Diane set the women's world record that stood for over 25 years.

Bragg died at his home in Oakley, California, from the effects of Parkinson's disease, diabetes, and a stroke on February 16, 2019, aged 83.

== Records ==
- World record: pole vault — 4.80 m (July 2, 1960)

== Championships ==
- 1955 NCAA: Pole Vault (1st)
- 1957 AAU Indoors: Pole Vault (1st)
- 1958 AAU Indoors: Pole Vault (1st)
- 1959 AAU Indoors: Pole Vault (1st)
- 1959 AAU Outdoors: Pole Vault (1st)
- 1960 AAU Indoors: Pole Vault (1st)
- 1960 Summer Olympics: Pole Vault — 4.70 m (1st)
- 1961 AAU Indoors: Pole Vault (1st)

== Education ==
- High school: Penns Grove High School (Penns Grove, New Jersey), 1953
- Undergraduate: Villanova (Philadelphia, Pennsylvania), 1957

Records
Preceded by (United States) Robert Gutowski	Men's Pole Vault World Record Holder; July 2, 1960 – May 20, 1961	Succeeded by (United States) George Davies
