= Sutinen =

Sutinen is a Finnish surname.

== Geographical distribution ==
As of 2014, 84.6% of all known bearers of the surname Sutinen were residents of Finland (frequency 1:2,402), 5.7% of Australia (1:153,380), 4.3% of Sweden (1:84,160) and 3.7% of the United States (1:3,576,745).

In Finland, the frequency of the surname was higher than national average (1:2,402) in the following regions:

1. Kainuu (1:508)
2. Northern Savonia (1:575)
3. North Karelia (1:796)
4. Southern Savonia (1:1,431)
5. South Karelia (1:1,941)
6. Päijänne Tavastia (1:2,052)

== People ==
- Matti Sutinen (born 1930), Finnish athlete
- Timo Sutinen (born 1949), Finnish professional ice hockey player
