= Roubanis =

Roubanis (in Greek: Ρουμπάνης) is a last name from Peloponnese. Notable people with the surname include:

- Aristeidis Roubanis (1932–2018), Greek basketball player and javelin thrower
- Georgios Roubanis (1929–2025), Greek Olympic pole vaulter
- Nick Roubanis, a Greek American music instructor, sometimes credited as the composer of "Misirlou"
