= Athletics at the 1957 World University Games – Men's pole vault =

The men's pole vault event at the 1957 World University Games was held at the Stadium Charlety in Paris on 7 September 1957.

== Medalists ==
Gold	Silver	Bronze
Zenon Ważny; Poland	Jerry Welbourn; United States	Leon Lukman; Yugoslavia

== Results ==
=== Final ===
Rank	Name	Nationality	3.60	3.80	4.00	4.10	4.15	4.25	4.30	4.35	4.40	Result	Notes
1st place, gold medalist(s)	Zenon Ważny	Poland						o	o	o	o	4.40	
2nd place, silver medalist(s)	Jerry Welbourn	United States						o	o	xxx		4.30	
3rd place, bronze medalist(s)	Leon Lukman	Yugoslavia						o	xxx			4.25	
4	Noriaki Yasuda	Japan										4.15	
5	Dimitar Khlebarov	Bulgaria										4.10	
6	Adam Bezeg	Poland										4.00	
6	Kazimierz Bednawski	Poland										4.00	
8	Christian Ramadier	France										4.00	
9	Stanislav Štefkovič	Czechoslovakia										3.80	
10	Edmondo Ballotta	Italy										3.80	
12	René Mazier	France										3.60	
12	Nugent	Great Britain										3.60	
