= Women's pole vault world record progression =

History since official recordkeeping began in 1994

The first world record in the women's pole vault was recognized by the International Association of Athletics Federations in 1994. The inaugural record, 4.05 metres by Sun Caiyun of China set in 1992, was the world's best mark as of December 31, 1994.

As of June 21, 2009, the IAAF has ratified 54 world records in the event.

== Pre-IAAF Record Progression ==
The first mark shows the measurement system in use at the time of the jump, the second mark shows the conversion. Marks set in the USA during this era were always measured in imperial measurements. Most of the world and IAAF recognize marks in metric measurements.

Mark	Athlete	Nation	Venue	Date	#
4 ft 9 in (1.44 m)	Ruth Spencer	United States	Painesville	14 May 1910	
4 ft 10 in (1.47 m)	Ruth Spencer	United States	Painesville	15 May 1911	
4 ft 11 in (1.49 m)	Ruth Spencer	United States	Painesville	15 May 1911	
5 ft 0 in (1.52 m)	Ruth Spencer	United States	Painesville	15 May 1911	
5 ft 1 in (1.54 m)	Ruth Spencer	United States	Painesville	15 May 1911	
5 ft 2 in (1.57 m)	Ruth Spencer	United States	Painesville	15 May 1911	
5 ft 3 in (1.6 m)	Ruth Spencer	United States	Painesville	15 May 1911	
5 ft 4 in (1.62 m)	Ruth Spencer	United States	Painesville	15 May 1911	
5 ft 5 in (1.65 m)	Ruth Spencer	United States	Painesville	15 May 1911	
5 ft 6 in (1.67 m)	Ruth Spencer	United States	Painesville	15 May 1911	
5 ft 7 in (1.7 m)	Ruth Spencer	United States	Painesville	15 May 1911	
5 ft 7 3/4 in (1.72 m)		United States			
5 ft 8 in (1.72 m)	Hazel Hutaff	United States	Rock Hill	3 April 1915	
5 ft 9 in (1.75 m)	Hazel Hutaff	United States	Rock Hill	3 April 1915	
5 ft 9 3/4 in (1.77 m)	Hazel Hutaff	United States	Rock Hill	3 April 1915	
5 ft 10 in (1.77 m)	Lois Tatum	United States	Tallahassee	13 April 1915	
=5 ft 10 in (1.77 m)	Emma Lee King	United States	Tallahassee	13 April 1915	
6 ft 0 1/2 in (1.84 m)	Lois Tatum	United States	Tallahassee	13 April 1915	
=6 ft 0 1/2 in (1.84 m)	Eva Fisk	United States	Lincoln	13 May 1915	
6 ft 1 in (1.85 m)	Eva Fisk	United States	Lincoln	13 May 1915	
6 ft 3 in (1.9 m)	Eva Fisk	United States	Lincoln	13 May 1915	
=6 ft 3 in (1.9 m)	Mildred Carl	United States	New Haven	6 June 1915	
6 ft 4 in (1.93 m)	Mildred Carl	United States	New Haven	6 June 1915	
6 ft 5 in (1.95 m)	Mildred Carl	United States	New Haven	6 June 1915	
6 ft 6 in (1.98 m)	Mildred Carl	United States	New Haven	6 June 1915	
6 ft 7 in (2 m)	Mildred Carl	United States	New Haven	6 June 1915	
6 ft 8 in (2.03 m)	Mildred Carl	United States	New Haven	6 June 1915	
6 ft 9 in (2.05 m)	Mildred Carl	United States	New Haven	6 June 1915	
6 ft 10 in (2.08 m)	Mildred Carl	United States	New Haven	6 June 1915	
6 ft 11 in (2.1 m)	Mildred Carl	United States	New Haven	6 June 1915	
7 ft 0 in (2.13 m)	Mildred Carl	United States	New Haven	6 June 1915	
7 ft 1 in (2.15 m)	Mildred Carl	United States	New Haven	6 June 1915	
7 ft 2 in (2.18 m)	Mildred Carl	United States	New Haven	6 June 1915	
7 ft 3 in (2.2 m)	Mildred Carl	3 June 1919	New Haven		
2.25 m (7 ft 4 1/2 in)	Elva Hintze	Germany	Nürnberg	17 July 1921	
2.30 m (7 ft 6 1/2 in)	Helene Henneke	Germany	Nürnberg	17 July 1921	
2.35 m (7 ft 8 1/2 in)	Helene Henneke	Germany	Nürnberg	17 July 1921	
=2.35 m (7 ft 8 1/2 in)	Yelena Goldobina	Soviet Union	Moskva	7 September 1924	
2.53 m (8 ft 3 1/2 in)	Zoya Romanova	Soviet Union	Moskva	26 August 1935	
8 ft 6 in (2.59 m)	Diane Bragg	United States	Philadelphia	6 July 1952	
=8 ft 6 in (2.59 m)	Brenda Walker	New Zealand	Wairoa	8 Jan 1969	
8 ft 6 1/2 in (2.6 m) i	Irene Spieker	United States	Louisville	10 February 1978	
8 ft 7 in (2.61 m) i	Irene Spieker	United States	Louisville	9 February 1979	
9 ft 0 in (2.74 m) i	Irene Spieker	United States	Louisville	9 February 1979	
9 ft 7 in (2.92 m) i	Irene Spieker	United States	Louisville	9 February 1979	
10 ft 0 1/4 in (3.05 m) i	Irene Spieker	United States	Louisville	9 February 1979	
10 ft 0 1/4 in (3.05 m)	Jana Edwards	United States		* June 1983	
10 ft 6 in (3.2 m)	Jana Edwards	United States	Chicago	11 June 1983	
10 ft 7 in (3.22 m)	Jana Edwards	United States	Cleveland	18 June 1983	
11 ft 1 in (3.37 m)	Jana Edwards	United States	Cleveland	18 June 1983	
11 ft 6 in (3.5 m)	Jana Edwards	United States	Fort Wayne	23 July 1983	
11 ft 9 1/2 in (3.59 m)	Jana Edwards	United States	Fort Wayne	23 July 1983	
3.72 m (12 ft 2 1/4 in)	Zhang Chunzhen	China	Guangzhou	20 April 1988	
3.73 m (12 ft 2 3/4 in)	Shao Jingmen	China	Guangzhou	4 May 1988	
3.75 m (12 ft 3 1/2 in)	Zhang Chunzhen	China	Nanjing	10 June 1988	
3.76 m (12 ft 4 in)	Zhou Minxin	China	Fuzhou	22 April 1989	
3.8 m (12 ft 5 1/2 in)	Zhang Chunzhen	China	Guangzhou	9 September 1989	
3.81 m (12 ft 6 in)	Zhang Chunzhen	China	Guangzhou	24 March 1990	
3.83 m (12 ft 6 3/4 in)	Sun Caiyun	China	Guangzhou	24 March 1991	
=3.83 m (12 ft 6 3/4 in)	Zhang Chunzhen	China	Guangzhou	24 March 1991	
4.00 m (13 ft 1 1/4 in)	Zhang Chunzhen	China	Guangzhou	24 March 1991	
4.02 m (13 ft 2 1/4 in)	Zhang Chunzhen	China	Beijing	5 June 1991	
4.05 m (13 ft 3 1/4 in)	Zhang Chunzhen	China	Guangzhou	10 August 1991	

== IAAF Record Progression ==
Mark	Athlete	Nation	Venue	Date	#
4.05 m (13 ft 3 1/4 in)	Sun Caiyun	China	Nanjing, China	21 May 1992	1
4.08 m (13 ft 4 1/2 in)	Sun Caiyun	China	Nanjing, China	18 May 1995	2
4.08 m (13 ft 4 1/2 in)	Zhong Guiqing	China	Nanjing, China	18 May 1995	1
4.10 m (13 ft 5 1/4 in)	Daniela Bártová	Czech Republic	Ljubljana, Slovenia	21 May 1995	1
4.12 m (13 ft 6 in)	Daniela Bártová	Czech Republic	Duisburg, Germany	18 June 1995	2
4.13 m (13 ft 6 1/2 in)	Daniela Bártová	Czech Republic	Wesel, Germany	24 June 1995	3
4.14 m (13 ft 6 3/4 in)	Daniela Bártová	Czech Republic	Gateshead, England	2 July 1995	4
4.15 m (13 ft 7 1/4 in)	Daniela Bártová	Czech Republic	Ostrava, Czech Republic	6 July 1995	5
4.16 m (13 ft 7 3/4 in)	Daniela Bártová	Czech Republic	Feldkirch, Austria	14 July 1995	6
4.17 m (13 ft 8 in)	Daniela Bártová	Czech Republic	Feldkirch, Austria	15 July 1995	7
4.18 m (13 ft 8 1/2 in)	Andrea Müller	Germany	Zittau, Germany	5 August 1995	1
4.20 m (13 ft 9 1/4 in)	Daniela Bártová	Czech Republic	Köln, Germany	18 August 1995	8
4.21 m (13 ft 9 1/2 in)	Daniela Bártová	Czech Republic	Linz, Austria	22 August 1995	9
4.22 m (13 ft 10 in)	Daniela Bártová	Czech Republic	Salgótarján, Hungary	11 September 1995	10
4.25 m (13 ft 11 1/4 in)	Emma George	Australia	Melbourne, Australia	30 November 1995	1
4.28 m (14 ft 1/2 in)	Emma George	Australia	Perth, Australia	17 December 1995	2
4.30 m (14 ft 1 1/4 in)	Emma George	Australia	Perth, Australia	28 January 1996	3
4.41 m (14 ft 5 1/2 in)	Emma George	Australia	Perth, Australia	28 January 1996	4
4.42 m (14 ft 6 in)	Emma George	Australia	Reims, France	29 June 1996	5
4.45 m (14 ft 7 in)	Emma George	Australia	Sapporo, Japan	14 July 1996	6
4.50 m (14 ft 9 in)	Emma George	Australia	Melbourne, Australia	8 February 1997	7
4.55 m (14 ft 11 in)	Emma George	Australia	Melbourne, Australia	20 February 1997	8
4.57 m (14 ft 11 3/4 in)	Emma George	Australia	Auckland, New Zealand	21 February 1998	9
4.58 m (15 ft 1/4 in)	Emma George	Australia	Melbourne, Australia	14 March 1998	10
4.59 m (15 ft 1/2 in)	Emma George	Australia	Brisbane, Australia	21 March 1998	11
4.60 m (15 ft 1 in)	Emma George	Australia	Sydney, Australia	20 February 1999	12
4.60 m (15 ft 1 in)	Stacy Dragila	United States	Sevilla, Spain	21 August 1999	1
i 4.60 m (15 ft 1 in)	Stacy Dragila	United States	Pocatello, U.S.	19 Feb 2000	2
i 4.62 m (15 ft 1 3/4 in)	Stacy Dragila	United States	Atlanta, U.S.	3 Mar 2000	3
4.63 m (15 ft 2 1/4 in)	Stacy Dragila	United States	Sacramento, U.S.	23 July 2000	4
i 4.63 m (15 ft 2 1/4 in)	Stacy Dragila	United States	New York City, U.S.	2 Feb 2001	5
i 4.64 m (15 ft 2 1/2 in)	Svetlana Feofanova	Russia	Dortmund, Germany	11 February 2001	1
i 4.66 m (15 ft 3 1/4 in)	Stacy Dragila	United States	Pocatello, U.S.	17 Feb 2001	6
i 4.70 m (15 ft 5 in)	Stacy Dragila	United States	Pocatello, U.S.	17 Feb 2001	7
4.70 m (15 ft 5 in)	Stacy Dragila	United States	Pocatello, U.S.	27 April 2001	8
4.71 m (15 ft 5 1/4 in)	Stacy Dragila	United States	Stanford, U.S.	9 June 2001	9
4.81 m (15 ft 9 1/4 in)	Stacy Dragila	United States	Stanford, U.S.	9 June 2001	10
4.82 m (15 ft 9 3/4 in)	Yelena Isinbayeva	Russia	Gateshead, England	13 July 2003	1
i 4.83 m (15 ft 10 in)	Yelena Isinbayeva	Russia	Donets'k, Ukraine	15 February 2004	2
i 4.85 m (15 ft 10 3/4 in)	Svetlana Feofanova	Russia	Athens, Greece	22 February 2004	2
i 4.86 m (15 ft 11 1/4 in)	Yelena Isinbayeva	Russia	Budapest, Hungary	6 March 2004	3
4.87 m (15 ft 11 1/2 in)	Yelena Isinbayeva	Russia	Gateshead, England	27 June 2004	4
4.88 m (16 ft 0 in)	Svetlana Feofanova	Russia	Heraklion, Greece	4 July 2004	3
4.89 m (16 ft 1/2 in)	Yelena Isinbayeva	Russia	Birmingham, England	25 July 2004	5
4.90 m (16 ft 3/4 in)	Yelena Isinbayeva	Russia	London, England	30 July 2004	6
4.91 m (16 ft 1 1/4 in)	Yelena Isinbayeva	Russia	Athens, Greece	24 August 2004	7
4.92 m (16 ft 1 1/2 in)	Yelena Isinbayeva	Russia	Brussels, Belgium	3 September 2004	8
4.93 m (16 ft 2 in)	Yelena Isinbayeva	Russia	Lausanne, Switzerland	5 July 2005	9
4.95 m (16 ft 2 3/4 in)	Yelena Isinbayeva	Russia	Madrid, Spain	16 July 2005	10
4.96 m (16 ft 3 1/4 in)	Yelena Isinbayeva	Russia	London, England	22 July 2005	11
5.00 m (16 ft 4 3/4 in)	Yelena Isinbayeva	Russia	London, England	22 July 2005	12
5.01 m (16 ft 5 in)	Yelena Isinbayeva	Russia	Helsinki, Finland	9 August 2005	13
5.03 m (16 ft 6 in)	Yelena Isinbayeva	Russia	Rome, Italy	11 July 2008	14
5.04 m (16 ft 6 1/4 in)	Yelena Isinbayeva	Russia	Fontvieille, Monaco	29 July 2008	15
5.05 m (16 ft 6 3/4 in)	Yelena Isinbayeva	Russia	Beijing, China	18 August 2008	16
5.06 m (16 ft 7 in)	Yelena Isinbayeva	Russia	Zürich, Switzerland	28 August 2009	17

== See also ==
- Men's pole vault world record progression
- Women's pole vault indoor world record progression
- List of pole vaulters who reached 5 metres
