= Zbigniew Janiszewski =

Polish pole vaulter

Personal information
- Full name: Zbigniew Stanisław Janiszewski
- Nationality: Polish
- Born: 16 August 1931 (age 95) Kraków, Poland
- Height: 1.79 m (5 ft 10 in)
- Weight: 72 g

Sport
- Sport: Athletics
- Event: Pole vault
- Club: Olsza Kraków

Zbigniew Stanisław Janiszewski (born 16 August 1931) is a Polish athlete. He competed in the men's pole vault at the 1956 Summer Olympics.

He was married to the sprinter Barbara Sobotta-Janiszewska (died 2000).

His personal best in the event is 4.41 metres set in Warsaw in 1956.

== International competitions ==
| Year | Competition | Venue | Position | Notes |
Representing Poland
| 1956 | Olympic Games | Melbourne, Australia | 12th | 4.15 m |
