= Janusz Gronowski =

Polish pole vaulter (1935–2024)

Personal information
- Nationality: Polish
- Born: 2 January 1935 Korzec, Poland (modern-day Korets, Ukraine)
- Died: 14 June 2024 (aged 89) Wrocław, Poland
- Height: 1.75 m (5 ft 9 in)
- Weight: 73 kg (161 lb)

Sport
- Sport: Athletics
- Event: Pole vault
- Club: Gwardia Wrocław; Gwardia Warszawa

Janusz Ignacy Gronowski (2 January 1935 – 14 June 2024) was a Polish athlete. He competed in the men's pole vault at the 1960 Summer Olympics. Gronowski died on 14 June 2024, at the age of 89.

His personal best in the event was 4.80 metres set in Lahti in 1963.

== International competitions ==
Year	Competition	Venue	Position	Notes
Representing Poland
1960	Olympic Games	Rome, Italy	18th (q)	4.20 m
1961	Universiade	Sofia, Bulgaria	6th	4.40 m
1962	European Championships	Belgrade, Yugoslavia	14th	4.30 m
