= Lennart Lind =

Swedish pole vaulter

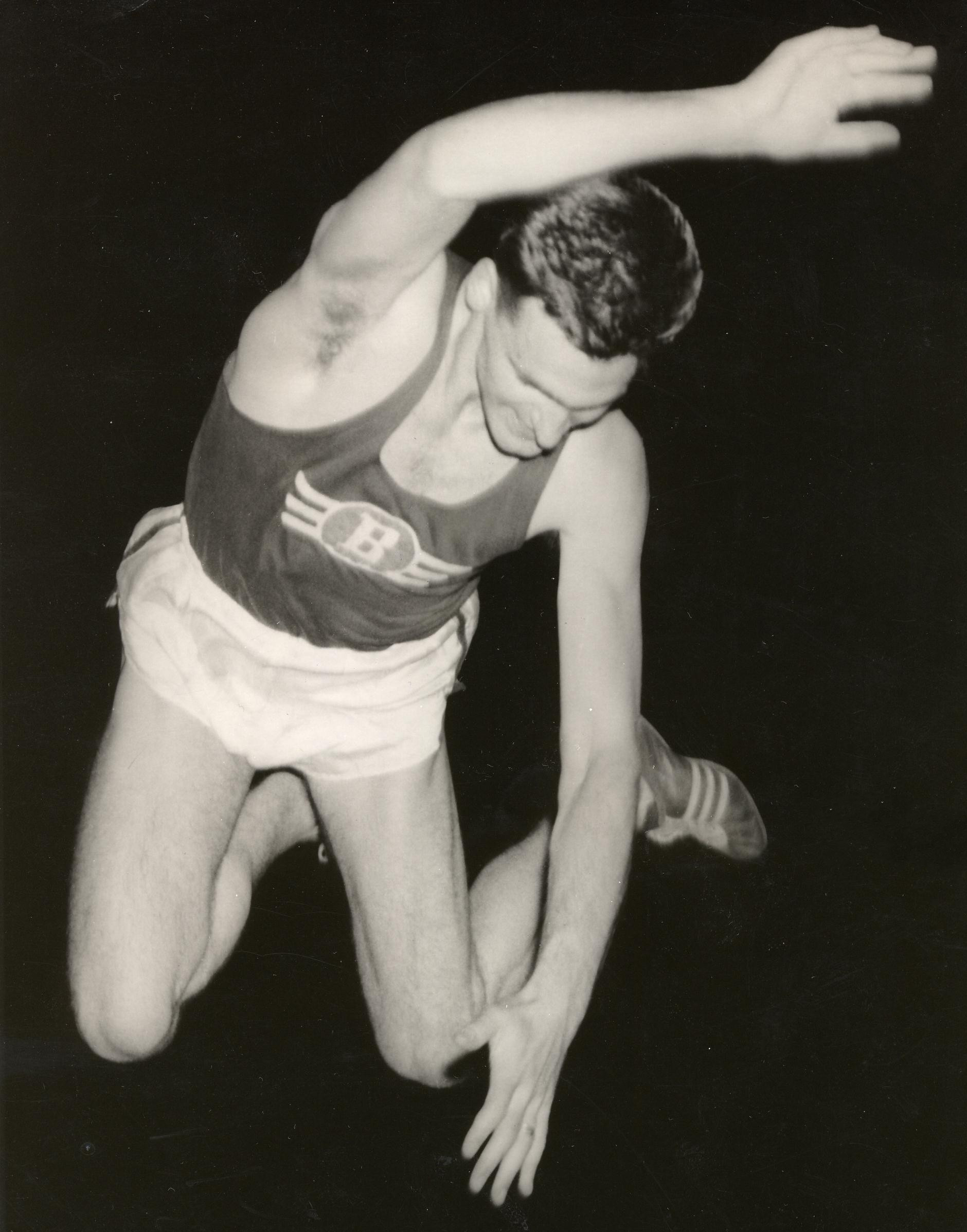

Personal information
- Born: 12 April 1930 (age 96) Klippan, Sweden
- Height: 180 cm (5 ft 11 in)
- Weight: 74 kg (163 lb)

Sport
- Sport: Athletics
- Event: Pole vault
- Club: Bromma IF

Achievements and titles
- Personal best: 4.40 (1957)

Lennart Gustaf Lind (12 April 1930 – 5 February 2026) was a retired Swedish pole vaulter. He was eleventh at the 1952 Summer Olympics and fourth at the 1958 European Championships. Lind won the national pole vault title in 1960 after finishing second seven times.
