= Jānis Krasovskis =

Latvian pole vaulter

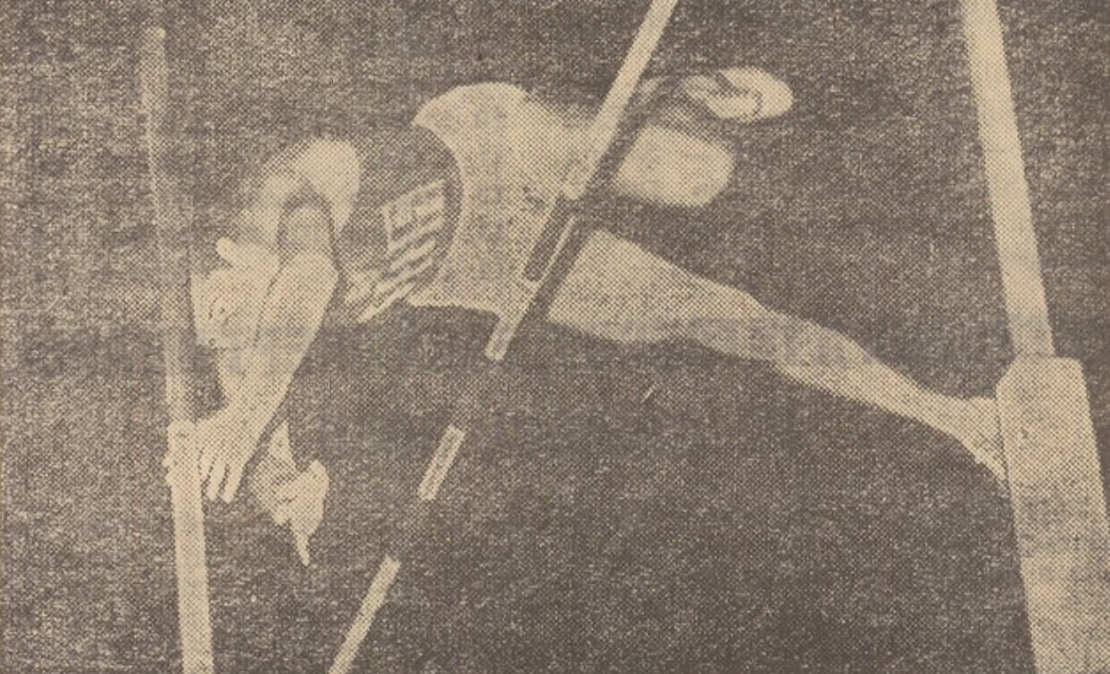
- Krasovskis in 1961

Personal information
- Nationality: Latvian
- Born: 12 February 1936 (age 90) Viesīte, Viesītes novads
- Height: 178 cm (5 ft 10 in)
- Weight: 74 kg (163 lb)

Sport
- Country: Soviet Union
- Sport: Athletics
- Event: Pole vault

Jānis Krasovskis (born 12 February 1936) is a Latvian athlete. He competed in the men's pole vault at the 1960 Summer Olympics, representing the Soviet Union - he achieved 4.40m and took 13th place.
