= Orhan Altan =

Turkish pole vaulter

Personal information
- Nationality: Turkish
- Born: 4 January 1934 Ankara, Turkey
- Died: February 2007

Sport
- Sport: Athletics
- Event: Pole vault

Orhan Altan (4 January 1934 – February 2007) was a Turkish athlete. He competed in the men's pole vault at the 1960 Summer Olympics.
