= Andrzej Krzesiński =

Polish pole vaulter (1927–2024)

Personal information
- Full name: Andrzej Lech Krzesiński
- Nationality: Polish
- Born: 1 October 1927 Białobrzegi, Poland
- Died: 4 November 2024 (aged 97)
- Education: Warsaw Academy of Physical Education
- Height: 1.78 m (5 ft 10 in)
- Weight: 65 kg (143 lb)
- Spouse: Elżbieta Duńska (died 2015)

Sport
- Sport: Athletics
- Event: Pole vault
- Club: Budowlani Gdańsk; Skra Warszawa

Andrzej Lech Krzesiński (1 October 1927 – 4 November 2024) was a Polish athlete. He competed in the men's pole vault at the 1960 Summer Olympics.

Krzesiński was married to 1956 long jump Olympic champion Elżbieta Duńska until her death in 2015, and they competed together at the 1960 Summer Olympics. After retiring from competitive career Krzesiński became a pole vault coach, training among other the 1976 Olympic Champion Tadeusz Ślusarski. After 1980 he emigrated first to Great Britain and in 1982 to the United States where he coached vaulters in Oregon until coming back to Poland in 2001.

Andrzej Krzesiński died on 4 November 2024, at the age of 97.

His personal best in the event was 4.505 metres outdoors set in 1962 and 4.20 metres indoors set in Warsaw in 1958.

== International competitions ==
Year	Competition	Venue	Position	Notes
Representing Poland
1958	European Championships	Stockholm, Sweden	10th	4.20 m
1960	Olympic Games	Rome, Italy	12th	4.30 m
