= Owen Okundaye =

Nigerian pole vaulter

Personal information
- Nationality: Nigerian
- Born: 19 April 1936 (age 90)

Sport
- Sport: Athletics
- Event: Pole vault

Owen Okundaye (born 19 April 1936) is a Nigerian athlete. He competed in the men's pole vault at the 1960 Summer Olympics.
