= Rolando Cruz =

Puerto Rican pole vaulter

Personal information
- Born: September 17, 1939 (age 86) Salinas, Puerto Rico
- Height: 180 cm (5 ft 11 in)
- Weight: 68 kg (150 lb)
Medal record
Men's Athletics
Representing Puerto Rico
Central American and Caribbean Games
Gold medal – first place	1959 Caracas	Pole vault
Gold medal – first place	1962 Kingston	Pole vault
Gold medal – first place	1966 San Juan	Pole vault
Ibero American Games
Gold medal – first place	1960 Santiago	Pole vault
Pan American Games
Bronze medal – third place	1959 Chicago	Pole vault

Rolando Cruz Quiñones (born September 17, 1939, in Salinas, Puerto Rico) is a former pole vaulter from Puerto Rico. He trained under Jimmy Curran at Mercersburg Academy and Jim 'Jumbo' Elliott at Villanova University. He competed for his native country in three consecutive Summer Olympics, starting in 1956 and was the flag bearer for Puerto Rico in the 1964 Summer Olympics opening ceremony. He is a three-time gold medalist at the Central American and Caribbean Games: 1959, 1962 and 1966.

His personal best in pole vault was 4.96 metres set in 1964. His brother, Rubén Cruz, was also a pole vaulter.

Cruz later became a lawyer and president of a life insurance company. From 1977 to 1981 he served as Commissioner Of Insurance of Puerto Rico.

== International competitions ==
Year	Competition	Venue	Position	Notes
Representing Puerto Rico
1956	Olympic Games	Melbourne, Australia	16th (q)	4.00 m
1959	Central American and Caribbean Games	Caracas, Venezuela	1st	4.40 m
1959	Pan American Games	Chicago, United States	3rd	4.32 m
1960	Olympic Games	Rome, Italy	4th	4.55 m
1960	Ibero-American Games	Santiago, Chile	1st	4.35 m
1962	Central American and Caribbean Games	Kingston, Jamaica	1st	4.72 m
1962	Ibero-American Games	Madrid, Spain	1st	4.50 m
1964	Olympic Games	Tokyo, Japan	21st (q)	4.50 m
1966	Central American and Caribbean Games	San Juan, Puerto Rico	1st	4.54 m
1967	Central American and Caribbean Championships	Xalapa, Mexico	1st	4.50 m
