= Ruth Spencer =

American athlete

Sport
- Sport: Track and field
- Event: Pole Vault

Ruth Spencer was the inaugural world record holder in the women's pole vault.

== Career ==
Spencer first achieved the world record of 4 ft 9 in (1.44 m) on 14 May 1910.

On 15 May 1911, she beat her record with a height of 5 ft 7 3/4 in (1.72 m). On the way to this height, she achieved ten intermediate world record marks of 4 ft 10 in (1.47 m), 4 ft 11 in (1.49 m), 5 ft 0 in (1.52 m), 5 ft 1 in (1.54 m), 5 ft 2 in (1.57 m), 5 ft 3 in (1.6 m), 5 ft 4 in (1.62 m), 5 ft 5 in (1.65 m), 5 ft 6 in (1.67 m) and 5 ft 7 in (1.7 m).

The records were achieved at Lake Erie College, Painesville, Ohio.
