= Zhang Chunzhen =

Chinese pole vaulter (born 1970)

Zhang Chunzhen (born 1970) is a retired female pole vaulter from PR China, who was one of the leading athletes in her discipline in the early 1990s. Before the event was an official world record event for women, Zhang set and improved the world record eight times. She set her personal best (4.05 metres) in the women's pole vault event on 10 August 1991 in Guangzhou, China. When Chinese rival Sun Caiyun set the first official world record in the event in May 1992, she actually only equalled Zhang's 4.05 from the year before.
