= Zenon Ważny =

Polish pole vaulter

Personal information
- Full name: Zenon Romuald Ważny
- Nationality: Polish
- Born: 6 December 1929 Vilnius, Second Polish Republic (modern-day Lithuania)
- Died: 23 October 2017 (aged 87) Warsaw, Poland
- Height: 1.75 m (5 ft 9 in)
- Weight: 68 kg (150 lb)

Sport
- Sport: Athletics
- Event: Pole vault
- Club: Ogniwo Warsaw; AZS Warsaw

Zenon Romuald Ważny (6 December 1929 – 23 October 2017) was a Polish pole vaulter. He was born in Wilno, Poland (now in Lithuania). He competed at the 1956 Summer Olympics in Melbourne, where he placed sixth in men's pole vault.

His personal best in the event was 4.53 metres set in Warsaw in 1958, which at the time was the national record.

== International competitions ==
Year	Competition	Venue	Position	Notes
Representing Poland
1951	World Festival of Youth and Students	East Berlin, East Germany	3rd	4.10 m
1952	Olympic Games	Helsinki, Finland	22nd (q)	3.80 m
1954	World Student Games	Budapest, Hungary	3rd	4.10 m
1954	European Championships	Bern, Switzerland	11th	4.15 m
1955	World Festival of Youth and Students	Warsaw, Poland	2nd	4.30 m
1956	Olympic Games	Melbourne, Australia	6th	4.25 m
1957	World University Games	Paris, France	1st	4.40 m
1958	European Championships	Stockholm, Sweden	5th	4.30 m
