= Kauko Nyström =

Finnish pole vaulter (1933–2009)

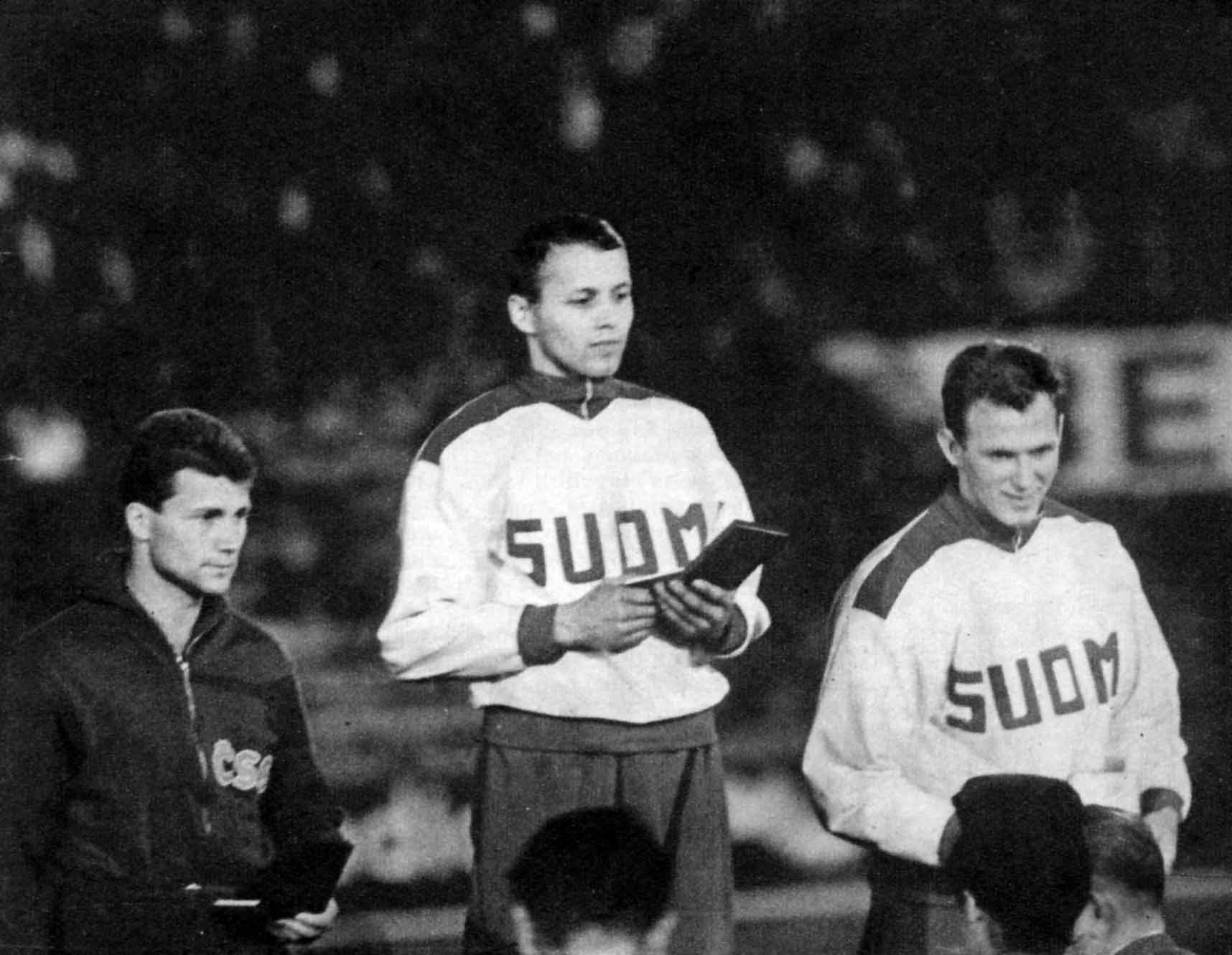
- Nyström (right) at the 1962 European Championships

Personal information
- Born: 3 March 1933 Somero, Finland
- Died: 1 February 2009 (aged 75) Somero, Finland

Sport
- Sport: Athletics
- Event: Pole vault

Achievements and titles
- Personal best: 4.83 m (1964)
Medal record
Men's athletics
Representing Finland
European Championships
| Bronze medal – third place | 1962 Belgrade | Pole vault |

Kauko Kalervo Nyström (3 March 1933 – 1 February 2009) was a Finnish pole vaulter who won a bronze medal at the 1962 European Championships.

Nyström retired due to an ankle injury and later worked as a watchmaker and sports official. He died from injuries sustained in a traffic accident, which occurred 10 days earlier. He had an elder brother Keijo, also a sportsman and watchmaker.
