= Anatoly Petrov (athlete) =

Soviet pole vaulter (1929–2014)

Personal information
- Nationality: Soviet
- Born: 19 August 1929
- Died: 1 July 2014 (aged 84)

Sport
- Sport: Athletics
- Event: Pole vault

Anatoly Petrov (19 August 1929 – 1 July 2014) was a Soviet athlete. He competed in the men's pole vault at the 1956 Summer Olympics.
