= Günter Malcher =

German pole vaulter

Personal information
- Nationality: German
- Born: 16 March 1934 (age 92)

Sport
- Sport: Athletics
- Event: Pole vault

Günter Malcher (born 16 March 1934) is a German athlete. He competed in the men's pole vault at the 1960 Summer Olympics.
