= Jana Shipley =

American athlete and coach

Jana Edwards Shipley
Sport
- Sport: Athletics
- Event: pole vault

Jana Edwards Shipley was a record holder in the women's pole vault.

== Early life ==
Shipley is a native of Galena, Ohio and attended Big Walnut High School. She attended Ohio State University, where she competed in track and cross country, and graduated in 1979 with a degree in physical education. She then attended the same university to receive a master's degree in sports management in 1981.

== Career ==
=== Athletics ===
Shipley had learned to pole vault in 1980 teaching male athletes whilst working as a track coach in a school in Big Walnut.

The then Jana Edwards record four world records in the women’s pole vault:

- 3.05 m in June 1983 in Chicago.
- 3.34 m on 16 July 1983 in Tillsonburg.
- 3.50 m and 3.59 m on 23 July 1983 in Fort Wayne.

Shipley became the first women to surpass 3.50 m.

Note that the marks are unofficial because the IAAF did not list an official world record in the event until 1994.

=== Coaching ===
Shipley became the head women's track and field coach at Ohio Wesleyan University in 1980 and remained there until 1985.

Between 1987 and 1991 she was a golf coach at Ohio State University. She resigned from her coaching position in 1991.

She later became a golf coach, at Ohio Wesleyan, working there until 2020 when the program was cancelled because of the COVID-19 pandemic.

== Awards and honors ==
In 1996, Shipley was inducted into the Ohio Wesleyan Hall of Fame.
