= Khristo Khristov (pole vaulter) =

Bulgarian pole vaulter (1935–2015)

Personal information
- Nationality: Bulgarian
- Born: 2 January 1935 Pleven, Bulgaria
- Died: 10 July 2015 (aged 80)

Sport
- Sport: Athletics
- Event: Pole vault

Khristo Khristov (Bulgarian: Христо Христов; 2 January 1935 – 10 July 2015) was a Bulgarian athlete. He competed in the men's pole vault at the 1960 Summer Olympics.
