= Manfred Preußger =

German pole vaulter

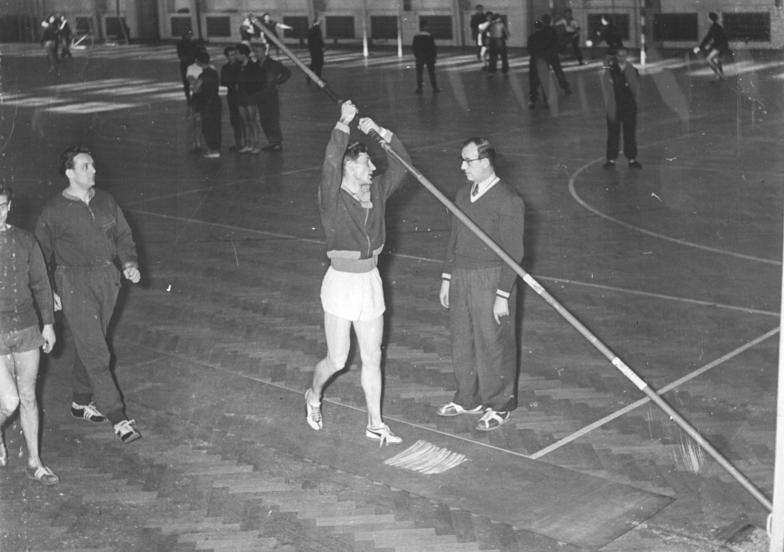
- Preußger in 1956

Personal information
- Nationality: German
- Born: 10 July 1932 (age 94) Schönlinde, Czechoslovakia
- Height: 178 cm (5 ft 10 in)
- Weight: 72 kg (159 lb)

Sport
- Sport: Athletics
- Event: Pole vault
Medal record
Men's athletics
Representing East Germany
European Championships
Silver medal – second place	1958 Stockholm	Pole vault

Manfred Preußger (born 10 July 1932) is a retired East German athlete. He competed in the men's pole vault at the 1956, 1960 and the 1964 Summer Olympics.
