= Mohamed Abdullah (Iraqi athlete) =

Iraqi pole vaulter

Personal information
- Nationality: Iraqi
- Born: 1935 (age 89–90) Baghdad, Iraq
- Height: 1.80 m (5 ft 11 in)
- Weight: 76 kg (168 lb)

Sport
- Sport: Athletics
- Event: Pole vault

Mohamed Abdullah (born 1935) is an Iraqi pole vaulter. He competed in the 1960 Summer Olympics.
