= Job Kjell Hovik =

Norwegian pole vaulter

Job Kjell Hovik (born 20 August 1937) is a former Norwegian pole vaulter. He represented SK Freidig.

He finished twelfth at the 1962 European Championships. He never competed at the Summer Olympics. He became Norwegian champion in the years 1959-1964.

His personal best jump was 4.70 metres, achieved in July 1964 at Trondheim stadion.
