= Rigas Efstathiadis =

Greek pole vaulter

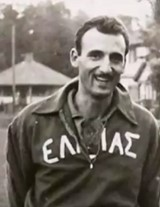

Rigas Efstathiadis (29 November 1931 – 18 September 2017) was a Greek pole vaulter who competed in the 1952 Summer Olympics.
