= Irene Spieker =

American athlete

Sport
- Sport: Athletics
- Event: pole vault

Irene Spieker was a world record holder in the women's pole vault.

== Early life ==
Spieker attended Virginia Tech and studied Health and Physical Education.

== Athletics career ==
Spieker recorded five world records in the women’s pole vault:

- 8 ft 6 1/2 in (2.6 m) on 10 February 1978 in Louisville, Kentucky.
- 8 ft 7 in (2.61 m), 9 ft 0 in (2.74 m), 9 ft 7 in (2.92 m) and 10 ft 0 1/4 in (3.05 m) on 9 February 1979 in Louisville, Kentucky.

Note 1: The marks are unofficial because the IAAF did not list an official world record in the event until 1994.

Note 2: Spieker became the first women to surpass 3.05 m.
