= Vladimir Bulatov =

Soviet pole vaulter

Personal information
- Nationality: Soviet
- Born: 30 June 1929
- Died: 19 February 1976 (aged 46)

Sport
- Sport: Athletics
- Event: Pole vault
Medal record
Men's athletics
Representing Soviet Union
European Championships
Bronze medal – third place	1958 Stockholm	Pole vault

Vladimir Georgievich Bulatov (30 June 1929 – 19 February 1976) was a Soviet athlete. He competed in the men's pole vault at the 1956 Summer Olympics and the 1960 Summer Olympics, but in 1960 he broke his foot during the competition.
