= Vitaliy Chernobai =

Ukrainian pole vaulter (1929–2019)

Personal information
- Nationality: Ukrainian
- Born: 23 May 1929
- Died: 19 May 2019 (aged 89)

Sport
- Sport: Athletics
- Event: Pole vault

Vitaliy Chernobai (23 May 1929 – 19 May 2019) was a Ukrainian athlete. He competed in the men's pole vault at the 1956 Summer Olympics, representing the Soviet Union.
