= Cornelius Warmerdam =

American pole vaulter (1915–2001)

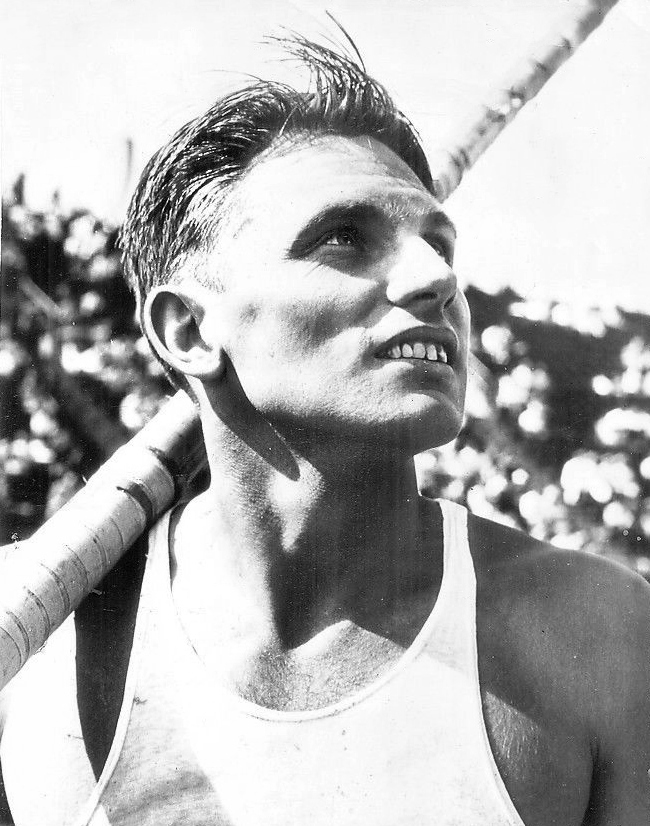
- Warmerdam in 1942

Personal information
- Nickname: Dutch
- Born: June 22, 1915 Long Beach, California, U.S.
- Died: November 13, 2001 (aged 86) Fresno, California, U.S.
- Height: 6 ft (183 cm)
- Weight: 170 lb (77 kg)

Sport
- Country: United States
- Sport: Athletics
- Event: Pole vault

Achievements and titles
- Personal best: 4.79 m (1943)
- Updated on June 1, 2015

Cornelius "Dutch" Warmerdam (June 22, 1915 – November 13, 2001) was an American pole vaulter who held the world record between 1940 and 1957. He missed the Olympics due to World War II, and retired from senior competitions in 1944, though he continued to vault into his sixties. He was inducted into the International Association of Athletics Federations Hall of Fame in 1974.

Warmerdam was born in Long Beach, California, the son of Dutch emigrants Adrianus and Gertrude Warmerdam. He grew up in Hanford, California. Because of his ancestry he was more commonly known to both friends and, later, to the media as "Dutch".

Warmerdam got his start in pole vaulting in his backyard using the limb of a peach tree and landing in a pit of piled up dirt. He was discovered by the local track coach and vaulted for Hanford High School until his graduation in 1932, after which he attended and vaulted for Fresno State College.

Vaulting throughout his career with a bamboo pole, Warmerdam was the first vaulter to clear 15 feet (4.6 m), accomplishing that feat at UC Berkeley on April 13, 1940. However, that achievement was not ratified for a world record, and his later vault of 4.60 m on June 29, 1940, was the first ratified jump over 15 feet. During his career, Warmerdam vaulted 15 feet 43 times in competition, while no other vaulter cleared the mark a single time. Warmerdam surpassed the pole vault record seven times in a four-year span, and three of those marks were ratified as world records. His highest outdoor vault was 15 ft 7 3/4 in (4.769 m), achieved at the Modesto Relays in 1942, a record which stood until 1957 when Bob Gutowski broke the mark using a metal pole. Warmerdam won the James E. Sullivan Award in 1942, but was never able to compete in the Olympics because the 1940 and 1944 games were cancelled due to World War II, and by 1948 he was coaching professionally and therefore ineligible. However, he continued competing as an early practitioner of Masters athletics. He still is ranked in the world all-time top ten list in the M60 Decathlon.

Warmerdam went on to coach track and field at Fresno State University until his retirement in 1980. His team won the second NCAA Men's Division II Outdoor Track and Field Championships, essentially at home at Ratcliffe Stadium. Fresno State named its track stadium Warmerdam Field in his honor. Dutch is a member of several halls of fame, including the National Track and Field Hall of Fame and the Millrose Games Hall of Fame.

Warmerdam married Juanita Anderson on August 29, 1940, and they were married for 61 years until Dutch's death in Fresno, California, from Alzheimer's in 2001. Juanita continued to live in Fresno until her death on Valentine's Day in 2006. They left behind five children (Mark, Greg, Gloria, David, and Barry) and twenty grandchildren.

Records
Preceded by (United States) Earle Meadows	Men's Pole Vault World Record Holder; June 29, 1940 – April 27, 1957	Succeeded by (United States) Bob Gutowski
