= Ihor Petrenko =

Ukrainian pole vaulter (born 1938)

Personal information
- Nationality: Ukrainian
- Born: 10 May 1938 (age 88) Kyiv, Soviet Union

Sport
- Sport: Athletics
- Event: Pole vault
Medal record
Representing Soviet Union
Summer Universiade
Bronze medal – third place	1961 Sofia	Pole vault

Ihor Petrenko (Ukrainian: Ігор Петренко; born 10 May 1938) is a Ukrainian athlete. He competed in the men's pole vault at the 1960 Summer Olympics, representing the Soviet Union.
