= Gérard Barras =

Swiss pole vaulter

Personal information
- Nationality: Swiss
- Born: 12 January 1937 Brig-Glis, Switzerland
- Died: 10 July 1979 (aged 42) Paris, France

Sport
- Sport: Athletics
- Event: Pole vault
Medal record
Representing Switzerland
Summer Universiade
Silver medal – second place	1961 Sofia	Pole vault

Adrien Gérard Barras (12 January 1937 – 10 July 1979) was a Swiss athlete. He competed in the men's pole vault at the 1960 Summer Olympics.
