= Bob Gutowski =

American pole vaulter (1935–1960)

Personal information
- Born: 25 April 1935
- Died: 2 August 1960 (aged 25)
Medal record
Men's Athletics
Representing the United States
Olympic Games
Silver medal – second place	1956 Melbourne	Pole vault

Robert Allen Gutowski (25 April 1935 – 2 August 1960) was an American athlete who competed mainly in the pole vault. He competed for the United States in the 1956 Summer Olympics held in Melbourne, Australia in the Pole Vault where he won the silver medal behind Bob Richards' second consecutive gold medal, after finishing fourth in the US Olympic Trials and only getting to the games on the withdrawal of Jim Graham.

He attended Occidental College in Los Angeles where he won the NCAA Men's Outdoor Track and Field Championships in 1956 (tied) and 1957. He set the World Record in the pole vault on April 27, 1957. Later in 1957 he cleared the highest height ever cleared with a "straight" pole at 15'9.75" though that mark was never ratified as a World Record because the pole passed under the bar.

In 1980, Bob Gutowski was inducted into the National Polish American Sports Hall of Fame. He is also a member of the Occidental College Track and Field Hall of Fame.

He was killed in a head-on collision by a drunk driver at Camp Pendleton on 2 August 1960 while serving as a 2nd Lieutenant in the Marine Corps Reserves. He was just 25 years old.

Records
Preceded by (United States) Cornelius Warmerdam	Men's Pole Vault World Record Holder; April 27, 1957 – July 2, 1960	Succeeded by (United States) Don Bragg
