= Ron Morris (pole vaulter) =

American pole vaulter (1935–2024)

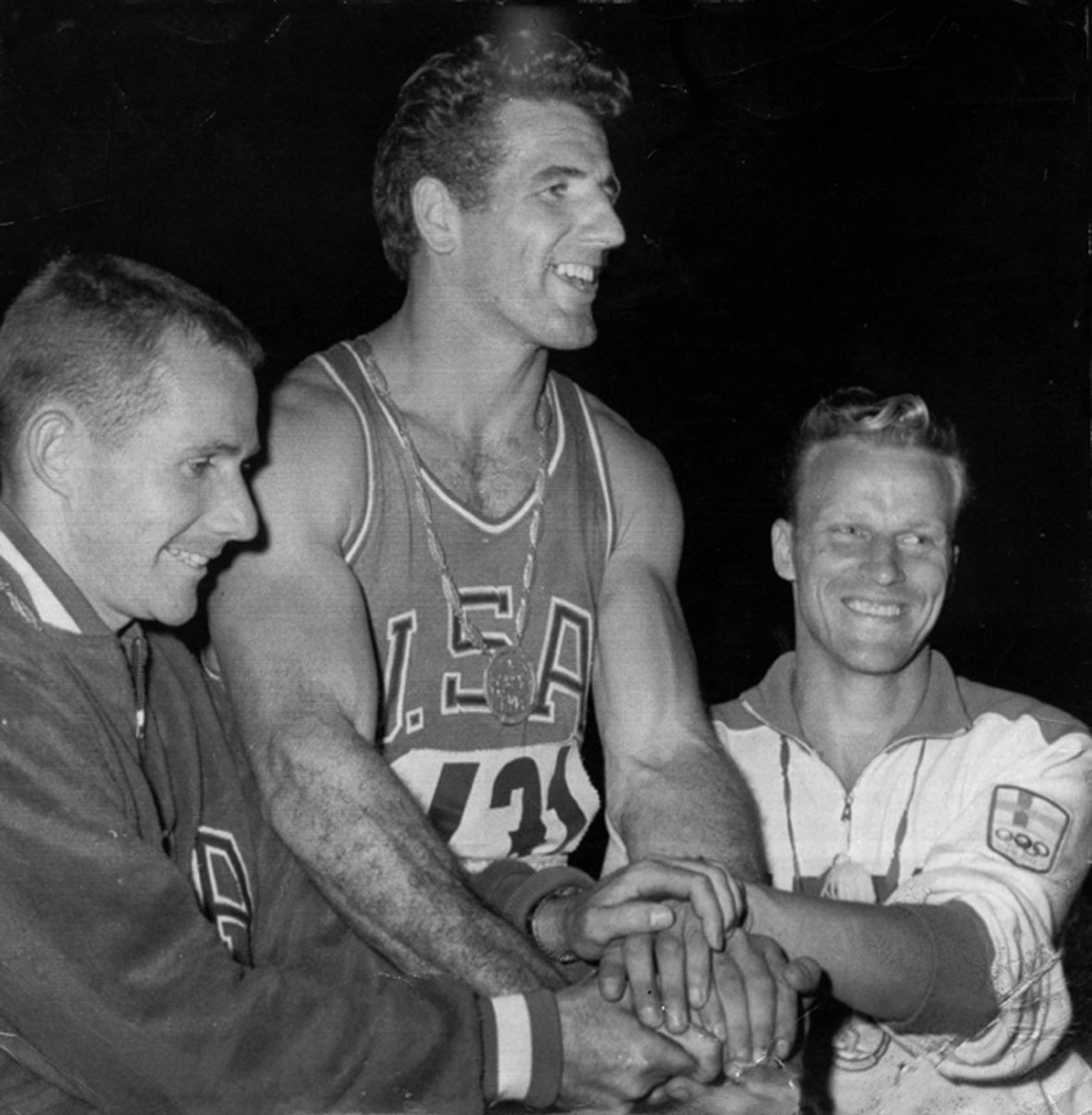
- Morris (left) at the 1960 Olympics

Personal information
- Full name: Ronald Hugh Morris
- Born: April 27, 1935 Glendale, California, U.S.
- Died: May 31, 2024 (aged 89)
- Height: 178 cm (5 ft 10 in)
- Weight: 70 kg (154 lb)

Sport
- Country: United States
- Sport: Athletics
- Event: Pole vault
- Club: Southern California Striders

Achievements and titles
- Personal best: 5.03 m (1966)
Medal record
Olympic Games
Silver medal – second place	1960 Rome	Pole vault

Ronald Hugh Morris (April 27, 1935 – May 31, 2024) was an American track and field athlete who won the national title in pole vault in 1958, 1961 and 1962. He placed fourth at the 1959 Pan American Games and second at the 1960 Summer Olympics. Morris vaulted 15 ft 0 in (4.57 m) in June 1971 for a Masters M35 World Record at the 1971 Los Angeles Senior Olympics. After retiring from competitions, he worked as athletics coach. Morris competed for the USC Trojans track and field team. He died on May 31, 2024, at the age of 89.

His athletic and coaching experience includes:

- 1952–1953 Two time California Interscholastic Pole Vault and U.S. Interscholastic Record Holder
- 1955–1957 Twice Intercollegiate All-American and University of Southern California Pole Vault Record Holder
- 1956 Sixth man in history to clear 15 feet
- 1956–1966 Eight times AAU All-American – ranked in the top 10 in the world for ten years
- 1960 Silver Medal in XVII Olympiad, Rome, Italy
- 1962 Only World Class athlete to successfully convert from steel to fiberglass (ranked #1 in the world that year)
- 1978 Ranked by Track and Field News as the 2nd Best Pole Vaulter (longevity) in history
- 1960–1978 Track Coach at California State University, Los Angeles (prepared several All-American athletes)
- 1978–? Owner and operator of On Track
