= Leon Lukman =

Serbian pole vaulter

Medal record

Men's Athletics

Representing Yugoslavia

International University Games
Bronze medal – third place	1957 Paris	Pole Vault

Leon Lukman (Serbian: Leon Lukman; born October 27, 1931) is a retired Serbian pole vaulter who represented SFR Yugoslavia at the 1960 Summer Olympics and won 9th place. He was a member of the Athletics Club Red Star Belgrade. He was born in Kragujevac.
