= Matti Sutinen =

Finnish pole vaulter (1930–2024)

Personal information
- Nationality: Finnish
- Born: 31 January 1930 Viipuri, Finland
- Died: 15 April 2024 (aged 94)

Sport
- Sport: Athletics
- Event: Pole vault

Matti Sutinen (31 January 1930 – 15 April 2024) was a Finnish athlete. He competed in the men's pole vault at the 1956 Summer Olympics and the 1960 Summer Olympics. Sutinen died on 15 April 2024, at the age of 94.
