= Georgios Roubanis =

Greek pole vaulter (1929–2025)

Medal record

Men's athletics

Representing Greece

Olympic Games
| Bronze medal – third place | 1956 Melbourne | Pole vault |

Georgios Roubanis (Greek: Γεωργιος Ρουμπανης; 15 August 1929 – 11 February 2025) was a Greek pole vaulter. He was born in Thessaloniki, Greece, and his family hails from Stemnitsa. He competed at three Olympic Games. He was the elder brother of Aristeidis. He was named the 1956 Greek Athlete of the Year.

At the 1956 Melbourne Olympic Games, he won a bronze medal in the pole vault, as he scored 4.50 m (Greek record at the time), on 26 November 1956. In order to attend the Melbourne event, Roubanis lost a semester of his studies at UCLA in the United States. He abandoned athletics in 1961. After studying political economics, he got his master's degree in local self-government. He had worked in the U.S. for 5 years as a management consultant, for a movie company. He had also set up an advertising company and a printing plant. In sports, he served as the president of the Panhellenic Association of Calisthenics and founded several other associations.

Roubanis died in Athens on 11 February 2025, at the age of 95.
