= Sloop John B =

Bahamian folk song

The John B. Sails
- Traditional song
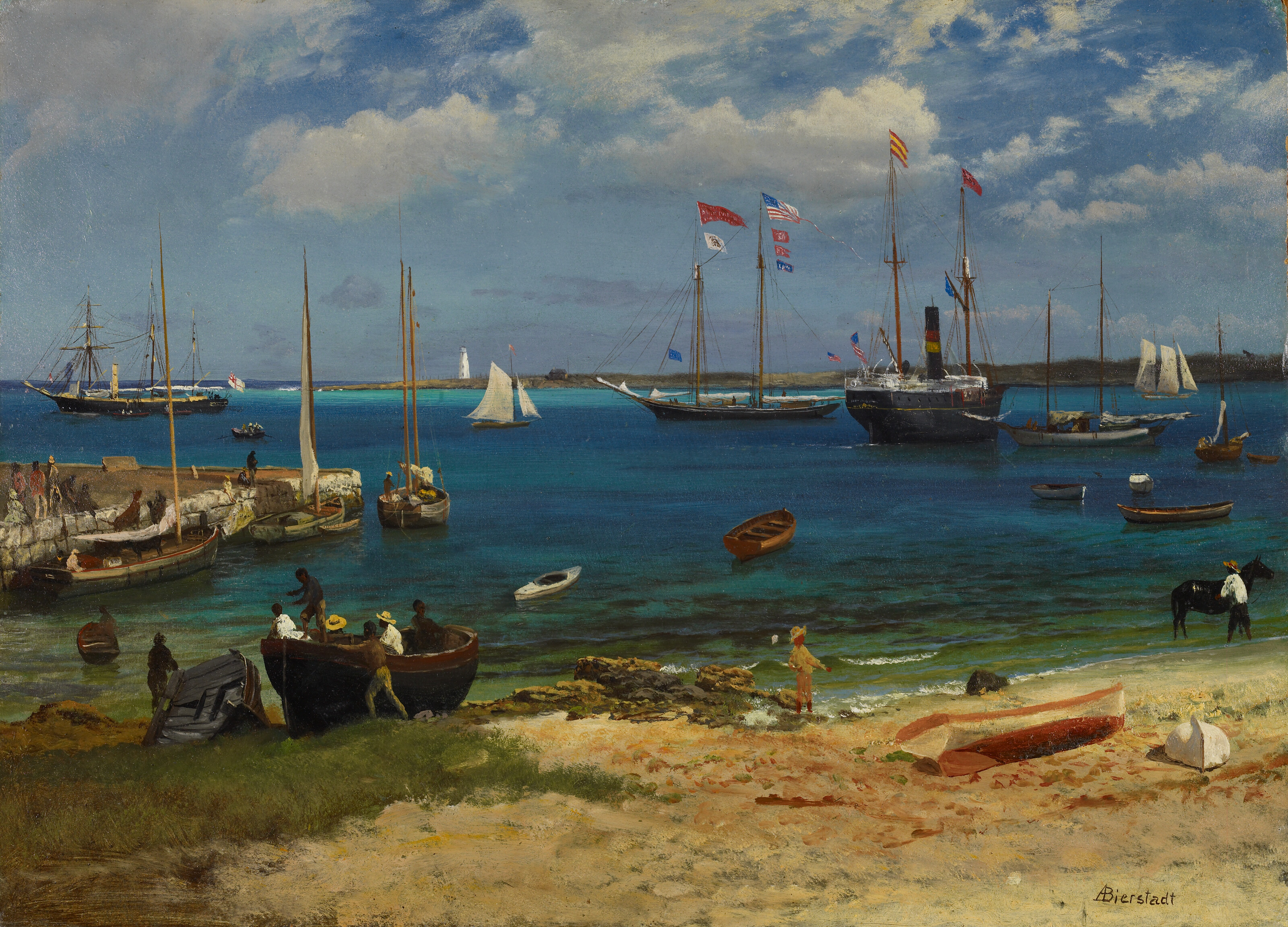
- Nassau Harbor after 1877, Albert Bierstadt, de Young Museum, San Francisco
- Other name: I Want to Go Home; Wreck of the John B.; Sloop John B; Hoist Up The John B Sails
- Style: Folk
- Language: English
- Published: 1916

"Sloop John B" (Roud 15634, originally published as "The John B. Sails") is a Bahamian folk song from Nassau. A transcription was published in 1916 by Richard Le Gallienne, and Carl Sandburg included a version in his The American Songbag in 1927. There have been many recordings of the song since the early 1950s, with variant titles including "I Want to Go Home" and "Wreck of the John B".

In 1966, American band the Beach Boys recorded a folk rock adaptation that was produced and arranged by Brian Wilson and released as the second single from their album Pet Sounds. The record peaked at number three in the U.S., number two in the UK, and topped the charts in several other countries. It was innovative for containing an elaborate a cappella vocal section not found in other pop music of the era, and it remains one of the group's biggest hits.

In 2011, the Beach Boys' version of "Sloop John B" was ranked number 276 on Rolling Stone's list of "The 500 Greatest Songs of All Time".

== Earliest publications ==
"The John B. Sails" was transcribed by Richard Le Gallienne, with five verses and the chorus published in his article "Coral Islands and Mangrove-Trees" in the December 1916 issue of Harper’s Monthly Magazine. Gallienne published the first two verses and chorus in his 1917 novel Pieces of Eight. The lyrics describe a disastrous voyage on a sloop, with the vessel plagued by drunkenness and arrests and a pig eating the narrator's food.

Carl Sandburg included the first three verses and chorus of "The John B. Sails" in his 1927 collection The American Songbag. He states that he collected it from John T. McCutcheon, a political cartoonist from Chicago. McCutcheon told him:

"The John B. Sails" (3:25)
Banjo/vocal performance of the song

Time and usage have given this song almost the dignity of a national anthem around Nassau. The weathered ribs of the historic craft lie imbedded in the sand at Governor's Harbor, whence an expedition, especially sent up for the purpose in 1926, extracted a knee of horseflesh and a ring-bolt. These relics are now preserved and built into the Watch Tower, designed by Mr. Howard Shaw and built on our southern coast a couple of points east by north of the star Canopus.

== The Beach Boys version ==
"Sloop John B"
- U.S. picture sleeve

Single by the Beach Boys

from the album Pet Sounds
- B-side: "You're So Good to Me"
- Released: March 21, 1966
- Recorded: July 12 – December 29, 1965
- Studio: United Western, Hollywood
- Genre: Folk rock; chamber pop; sea shanty
- Length: 2:59
- Label: Capitol
- Songwriters: Traditional, arranged by Brian Wilson
- Producer: Brian Wilson

The Beach Boys singles chronology
"Barbara Ann" (1965)	"Sloop John B" (1966)	"Wouldn't It Be Nice" (1966)

Music video
- "Sloop John B" on YouTube

Audio sample
- file; help

=== Arrangement ===
The Kingston Trio's 1958 recording of "The John B. Sails" was recorded under the title "The Wreck of the John B." It was the direct influence on the Beach Boys' version. The Beach Boys' Al Jardine was a keen folk music fan, and he suggested to Brian Wilson that the Beach Boys should record the song. As Jardine explains:

Brian was at the piano. I asked him if I could sit down and show him something. I laid out the chord pattern for 'Sloop John B.' I said, 'Remember this song?' I played it. He said, 'I'm not a big fan of the Kingston Trio.' He wasn't into folk music. But I didn't give up on the idea. So what I did was to sit down and play it for him in the Beach Boys idiom. I figured if I gave it to him in the right light, he might end up believing in it. So I modified the chord changes so it would be a little more interesting. The original song is basically a three-chord song, and I knew that wouldn't fly.

Jardine updated the chord progression by having the subdominant (D♭ major) move to its relative minor (B♭ minor) before returning to the tonic (A♭ major), thus altering a portion of the song's progression from IV — I to IV — ii — I. This device is heard immediately after the lyric "into a fight" and "leave me alone".

So I put some minor changes in there, and it stretched out the possibilities from a vocal point of view. Anyway, I played it, walked away from the piano and we went back to work. The very next day, I got a phone call to come down to the studio. Brian played the song for me, and I was blown away. The idea stage to the completed track took less than 24 hours.

Wilson elected to change some lyrics: "this is the worst trip since I've been born" to "this is the worst trip I've ever been on", "I feel so break up" to "I feel so broke up", and "broke up the people's trunk" to "broke in the captain's trunk". The first lyric change has been suggested by some to be a subtle nod to the 1960s psychedelia subculture.

=== Recording ===
The instrumental section of the song was recorded on July 12, 1965, at United Western Recorders, Hollywood, California. It was the first song recorded for Pet Sounds. The session was engineered by Chuck Britz and produced by Brian Wilson. The master take of the instrumental backing took fourteen takes to achieve. Wilson's arrangement blended rock and marching band instrumentation with the use of flutes, glockenspiel, bass saxophone, bass, guitar, and drums.

The vocal tracks were recorded over two sessions. The first was recorded on December 22, 1965, at Western Recorders and produced by Wilson. The second, on December 29, added a new lead vocal and Billy Strange's 12-string electric guitar part. Jardine explained that Wilson "lined us up one at a time to try out for the lead vocal. I had naturally assumed I would sing the lead, since I had brought in the arrangement. It was like interviewing for a job. Pretty funny. He didn't like any of us. My vocal had a much more mellow approach because I was bringing it from the folk idiom. For the radio, we needed a more rock approach. Wilson and Mike [Love] ended up singing it." On the final recording, Brian Wilson sang the first and third verses and Mike Love sang the second.

Kent Hartman, in his book The Wrecking Crew, described Strange's contribution to the song. Brian Wilson called Strange into the studio one Sunday, played him the rough recording, and told him he needed an electric twelve-string guitar solo in the middle of the track. When Strange replied that he did not own a twelve string, Wilson responded by calling Glenn Wallichs, the head of Capitol Records and owner of Wallichs Music City. A Fender Electric XII and Twin Reverb amplifier were quickly delivered, despite the shop they were ordered from being closed on Sundays, and Strange recorded the guitar part in one take. Wilson gave Strange $2,000 to cover the cost of the equipment.

=== Single release ===
A music video for "Sloop John B" was filmed for the UK's Top of the Pops, directed by newly employed band publicist Derek Taylor. It was filmed at Brian's Laurel Way home with Dennis Wilson acting as cameraman.

The single, backed with the song "You're So Good to Me", was released on March 21, 1966 in the US and on April 15, 1966 in the UK. It entered the Billboard Hot 100 chart on April 2 and peaked at No. 3 on May 7, remaining on the chart for a total of 11 weeks. It charted highly throughout the world, and remained one of the Beach Boys' most popular and memorable hits. It was No. 1 in Germany, Austria, and Norway, all for five weeks each, as well as Sweden, Switzerland, the Netherlands, South Africa, and New Zealand. It was placed No. 2 in the UK, Ireland (where it remained the group's highest-charting single), Canada, and in Record World. It was the fastest Beach Boys seller to date, moving more than half a million copies in less than two weeks after release. It had a three-week stay at number 1 in the Netherlands, making it the "Hit of the Year".

Cash Box described the single as a "topflight adaptation" that treated "the folk oldie in a rhythmic, effectively-building warm-hearted rousing style." Record World said that "The Beach Boys have taken a tune from the folk books and given it an intriguing rock backing."

=== Other releases ===
In 1968, the recording's instrumental was released on Stack-O-Tracks. Along with sessions highlights, the box set The Pet Sounds Sessions includes two alternative takes, one with Carl Wilson singing lead on the first verse, and one with Brian singing all parts. In 2012, Al Jardine released his own version as a bonus track on the reissue of his solo album A Postcard from California. In 2016, to commemorate the fiftieth anniversary of Pet Sounds, Brian Wilson, Al Jardine, and Brian Wilson’s touring band performed “Sloop John B” live at Capitol Studios..

=== Personnel ===
Per archivists John Brode, Will Crerar, Joshilyn Hoisington and Craig Slowinski.

The Beach Boys

- Al Jardine – backing vocals
- Bruce Johnston — backing vocals
- Mike Love – lead (2nd verse) and backing vocals
- Brian Wilson – lead (1st and 3rd verses) and backing vocals, producer
- Carl Wilson – backing vocals
- Dennis Wilson – backing vocals

Additional musicians and production staff

- Hal Blaine – drums
- Chuck Britz – engineer
- Frank Capp – glockenspiel
- Al Casey – acoustic rhythm guitar
- Jerry Cole – 12-string lead guitar
- Steve Douglas – cricket clicker, tambourine
- Carol Kaye – electric bass
- Al De Lory – grand piano
- Jay Migliori – flute
- Jim Horn – flute
- Jack Nimitz – bass saxophone
- Lyle Ritz – string bass
- Billy Strange – 12-string lead guitar, overdubbed 12-string lead guitars
- Winston Wong – assistant engineer

=== Certifications ===
Region	Certification	Certified units/sales
United Kingdom (BPI)	Silver	200,000^{‡}
United States (RIAA)	Platinum	1,000,000^{‡}
^{‡} Sales+streaming figures based on certification alone.

=== Chart history ===
Weekly singles charts

Beach Boys version
Charts (1966)	Peak position
Australian Singles Chart	17
Austria (Ö3 Austria Top 40)	1
Belgium (Ultratop 50 Flanders)	5
Belgium (Ultratop 50 Wallonia)	39
Canada RPM Singles Chart	2
Finland (Suomen Virallinen)	39
Germany (GfK)	1
Ireland (IRMA)	2
Netherlands (Dutch Top 40)	1
Netherlands (Single Top 100)	1
New Zealand (Listener)	1
Norway (VG-lista)	1
South Africa (Springbok)	1
Sweden	1
UK Singles Chart	2
US Billboard Hot 100	3
U.S. Cash Box Top 100	5

Year-end charts

Beach Boys version
Chart (1966)	Rank
Netherlands (Dutch Top 40)	1
UK	21
U.S. Billboard Hot 100	61
U.S. Cash Box	53

== Sylvie Vartan version (in French) ==
"Mister John B"

Single by Sylvie Vartan
- Language: French
- B-side: "La chanson"
- Released: July 1966
- Recorded: Summer 1966
- Genre: Pop
- Length: 2:45
- Label: RCA Victor
- Songwriters: Traditional, Brian Wilson, Giles Thibaut, Georges Aber, Eddie Vartan

Sylvie Vartan singles chronology
"ll y a 2 filles en moi" (1966)	"Mister John B" (1966)	"Ballade pour un sourire" (1966)

In 1966, the song was adapted into French by Giles Thibaut, Georges Aber, and Eddie Vartan as "Mister John B" and performed by Vartan's sister Sylvie and released as a single in July 1966 as a non-album single, based on the Beach Boys version from earlier that year. The song had on-and-off chart success from mid-to-late 1966 on the French Belgian charts, peaking at Number 35 on the French Belgian charts on November 19, 1966. Vartan would go on to re-record the song for her 2013 album "Sylvie In Nashville" but failed to chart unlike the former version.

=== Charts ===
Chart (1966)	Peak position
Belgium (Ultratop 50 Wallonia)	35

== List of recordings ==
All versions titled "Sloop John B", except where noted.

- 1935 - Cleveland Simmons Group - "John B. Sails" (a Bahamas field recording collected by Alan Lomax)

1950s

- 1950 – The Weavers - "(The Wreck of the) John B"
- 1952 – Blind Blake (Blake Alphonso Higgs) – "John B. Sails"
- 1958 – The Kingston Trio – "(The Wreck of the) John B"
- 1959 – Johnny Cash – "I Want To Go Home"

1960s

- 1960 – Bud & Travis (Bud and Travis in Concert 1960)
- 1960 – Lonnie Donegan – "I Wanna Go Home (Wreck of the John B)" UK No. 5
- 1960 – Jimmie Rodgers - "Wreck of the John B" US No. 64 Can. No. 1 (3 weeks)
- 1961 – Jerry Butler - "John B" from LP "Folk Songs" (Vee-Jay records)
- 1962 – Arthur Lyman Group - "(The Sloop) John B."
- 1962 – Dick Dale and his Del-Tones
- 1962 – Keith and Enid - "Wreck of the John B"
- 1963 – The Brothers Four - "The John B. Sails"
- 1963 – Jon & Alun - "John B" (Relax Your Mind)
- 1964 – The Travellers of Bermuda
- 1965 – Barry McGuire
- 1966 – The Beach Boys ("Sloop John B") Can. #2
- 1966 – The Vibrators (Jamaica) Featuring Raymond Harper, Bobby Aitken & The Carib Beats - "Sloop John B" (Doctor Bird Records)
- 1966 - The Merrymen featuring Emile Straker - "Wreck of the John B" (Caribbean Treasure Chest)
- 1966 – Cornelis Vreeswijk and Ann-Louise Hansson - "Jag hade en gång en båt" ("Once I Had A Boat")
- 1966 – The Ventures
- 1967 – Gary Lewis & The Playboys - “Down on the Sloop John B.”
- 1967 – Marta Kristen and Billy Mumy sing a version in Lost in Space (S3E14 Castles In Space)
- 1969 – Laurel Aitken - released as (Sloop) John B

1970s

- 1970 – Chet Atkins and Jerry Reed - "Wreck of the John B" on album Me & Jerry
- 1972 – Joseph Spence (Good Morning Mr. Walker)
- 1973 – London Welsh Male Voice Choir
- 1979 – Bill Sharkey
- 1979 – The Irish Rovers (Tall Ships and Salty Dogs)

1980s

- 1981 – David Thomas & the Pedestrians
- 1983 – Dan Zanes
- 1984 – Rainy Day, featuring members of Rain Parade, The Dream Syndicate, and The Three O'Clock (Rainy Day)

1990s

- 1997 – Arjen Anthony Lucassen Strange Hobby
- 1998 – Jerry Jeff Walker
- 1999 – Tom Fogerty (The Very Best of Tom Fogerty)

2000s

- 2000 - Fisherman's Friends (Suck'em and Sea).
- 2000 – Catch 22 - "Wreck of the Sloop John B"
- 2001 – Me First and the Gimme Gimmes
- 2002 – Culture Cruncher (Si Begg) - "Sloop Dee J"
- 2003 – Ulfuls - "Sleep John B" (Japanese)
- 2004 – Dan Zanes & Festival Five Folk (Sea Music)
- 2004 – The Dicey Doh Singers (Classic Maritime Music from Smithsonian Folkways)
- 2005 – Roger McGuinn (The Folk Den Project) - "The John B's Sails"
- 2007 – Relient K
- 2007 – Okkervil River - "John Allyn Smith Sails"
- 2009 – Simple Minds (Graffiti Soul, deluxe edition)

2010s

- 2010 – Westminster Chorus (It Only Takes a Moment)
- 2011 – Bounding Main (Kraken Up)
- 2012 – Tom McRae (From The Lowlands)
- 2012 – Al Jardine (A Postcard from California)
- 2012 – Dwight Yoakam (at The Live Room)
- 2012 – Aurelio Voltaire - "Screw the Ocampa" (BiTrektual)
- 2015 – AJR – "Call My Dad"
- 2016 – Triángulo de Amor Bizarro - "A cantiga de Juan C"

2020s

- 2022 - Isle 'Ave a Shanty - Swinging the Lamp album.
