= Arjun Pulijal =

- Education: New York University
- Occupation: Music industry executive

Arjun Pulijal is an Indian-American music industry executive based in Los Angeles. He is the co-founder of the talent management and media collective Soft Shock, and formerly served as president of Capitol Music Group.

== Early life and education ==
Pulijal is a first generation Indian-American. He graduated from New York University in 2006 with a bachelor's degree in music and a minor in computer science.

== Career ==
=== Epic Records ===
Pulijal spent a little over six years at Epic Records from 2006 to 2012, initially in A&R, moving to marketing in 2009. While at Epic, he worked on campaigns for artists including Modest Mouse, Fiona Apple, Shakira, Death Grips, and Incubus.

=== Capitol Records ===
Pulijal joined Capitol Records' marketing department in 2013. In 2020, he was named the label's head of marketing, as senior vice president. In 2022, he was named president of Capitol Music Group, directly overseeing all areas of artist development. He stepped down from the role in 2024.

While with Capitol, Pulijal led marketing campaigns for Paul McCartney's Egypt Station in 2018, which was McCartney's first number one album debut; McCartney III, another number one album for McCartney; Beck's Morning Phase, which won the 2015 Grammy Award for Album of the Year along with four additional Grammy's; and Arcade Fire's 2013 album Reflektor. He also worked on campaigns for musicians including Doechii, Ice Spice, Troye Sivan, Maggie Rogers, Lil Baby, Halsey, Nine Inch Nails, ABBA, Lil Yachty, Norah Jones, and Elton John.

Pulijal was named to the Billboard 40 Under 40 list in 2017, and on the Gold House 2024 Most Impactful Asians A100 list.

=== Soft Shock ===
Pulijal and former Capitol Music Group CEO Michelle Jubelirer are the co-founders of Soft Shock, a talent management and media collective, which was announced on September 18, 2025. The company will focus on artist management, marketing, branding, and IP development.
