= Fairfax High School (Los Angeles) =

High school in Los Angeles, California

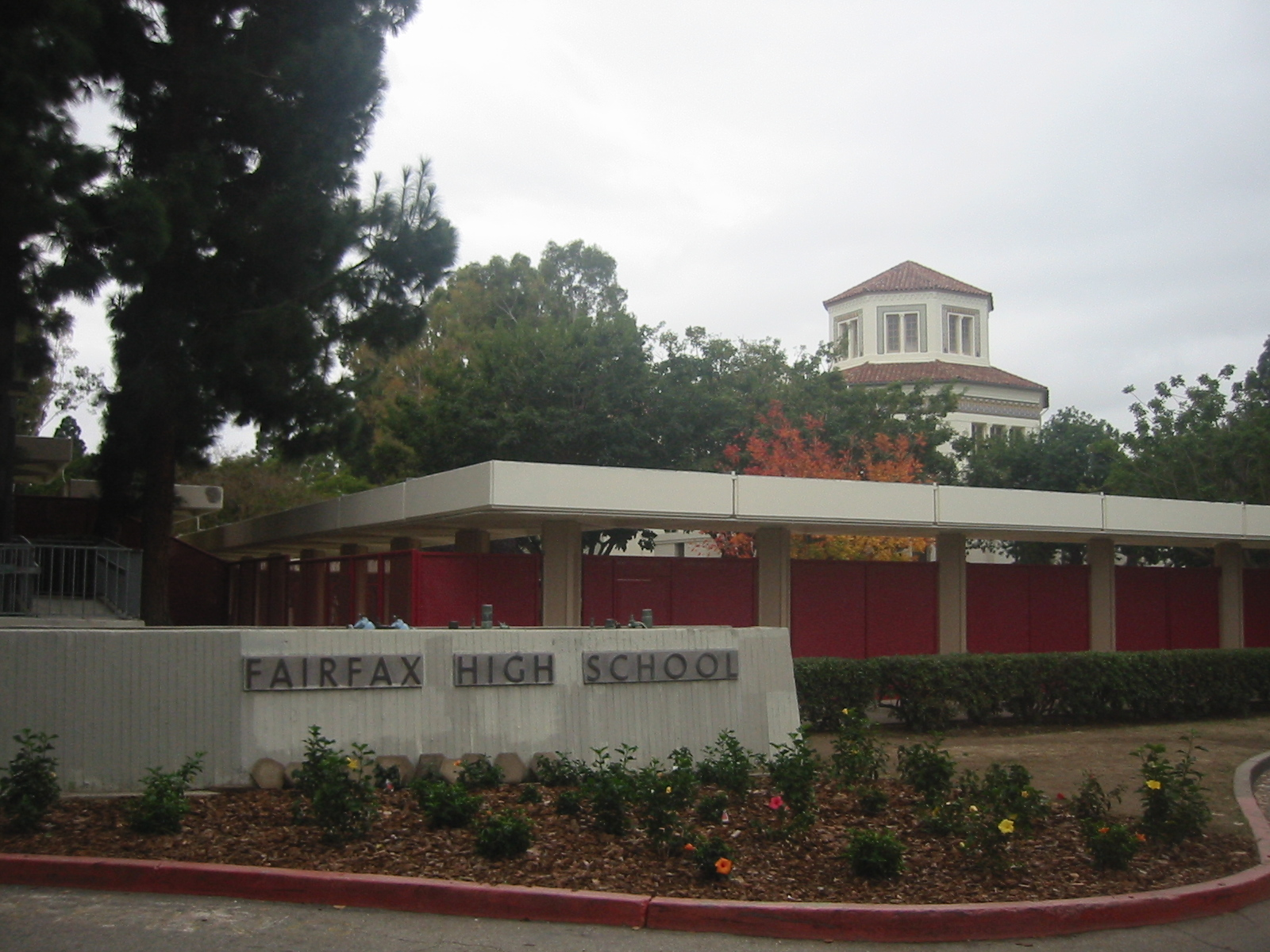

Location
- 7850 Melrose Avenue; Los Angeles, California 90046; United States; 34.082°N 118.360°W

Information
- Type: Public
- Motto: "Fare fac" (Say and Do)
- Established: 1924
- Locale: City, Large
- School district: Los Angeles Unified School District
- NCES District ID: 0622710
- NCES School ID: 062271002998
- Principal: Leonard Choi
- Teaching staff: 85.12 (on an FTE basis)
- Grades: 9–12
- Enrollment: 1,495 (2024–25)
  - Male: 839
  - Female: 656
- Student to teacher ratio: 17.56
- Campus size: 24.2 acres (98,000 m^{2})
- Colors: Crimson, gold and black
- Athletics conference: CIF Los Angeles City Section; Western League
- Nickname: Lions
- Newspaper: The Colonial Gazette
- Website: fairfaxhs.lausd.org

Fairfax High School (officially Fairfax Senior High School) is a Los Angeles Unified School District high school located in Los Angeles, California, near the border of West Hollywood in the Fairfax District of Los Angeles. The school is located on a 24.2-acre (98,000 m^{2}) campus at the intersection of Fairfax Avenue and Melrose Avenue, north of the CBS studios, right at the heart of the Thirty Mile Zone.

Several sections of Los Angeles, including the Fairfax District, Park La Brea, portions of Hancock Park, and Larchmont, and the city of West Hollywood are served by Fairfax. Some areas (including parts of West Hollywood) are jointly zoned to Fairfax High School and Hollywood High School. In fall 2007, some neighborhoods zoned to Hamilton High School were rezoned to Fairfax High School. Bancroft Middle School, Emerson Middle School, Le Conte Middle School, and John Burroughs Middle School feed into Fairfax. In 2009, some territory from the Los Angeles High School attendance boundary was transferred to Fairfax High School.

== History ==
Fairfax High School was founded in 1924 under the direction of Principal Rae G. Van Cleve, for whom the athletic field is named. When first built, with a backdrop of the iconic rotunda and Dewitt Swann

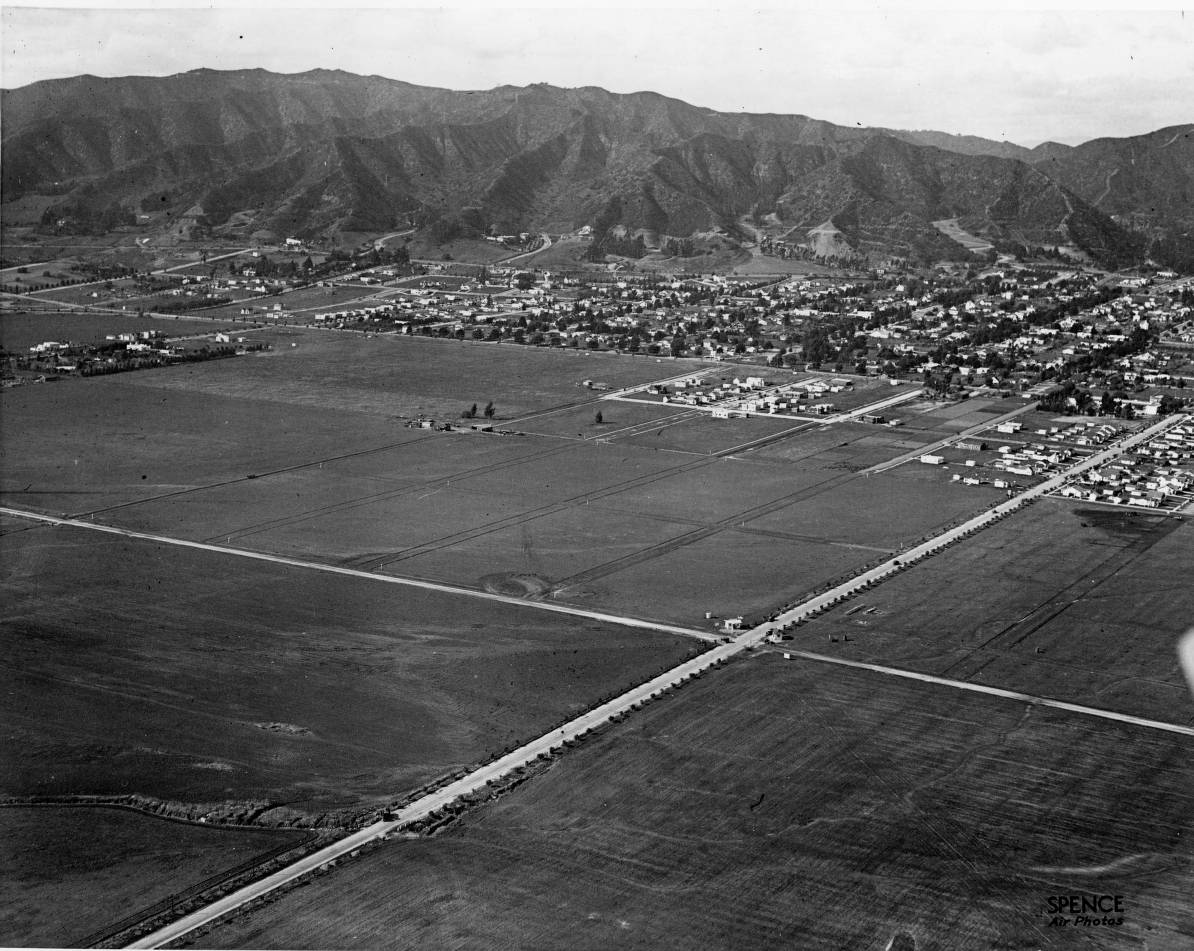
The site of Fairfax High School in 1922 (lower right)

Auditorium, a reflecting pond was the first thing students saw when they arrived at school. The school has seen numerous renovations over the years. The original Spanish Colonial Revival main building did not meet earthquake safety standards. In order to comply with Earthquake and modernization codes, the main building was demolished and replaced in 1966. However, the historic D. S. Swan Auditorium and iconic Rotunda were spared by preservationists and retrofitted. In 1971, a magnitude 6.7 earthquake struck Los Angeles, severely damaging other schools. The rotunda was not demolished during the rebuilding phase in 1966, leaving it as one of the only two rotundas on the west coast. The theater was renovated in 2014.

Greenway Court, originally built in 1939 as a social hall by the students at Fairfax as a class project, was also spared and was moved to its current location on Fairfax Avenue, where it was converted into a theater in 1999 by the Greenway Arts Alliance and renamed the Greenway Court Theater.

Former NFL official Jim Tunney served as the school's principal from 1964 to 1970. Most of the current campus facilities, except for those mentioned above, were built between 1966 and 1968.

When the 1971 San Fernando earthquake struck with a magnitude of 6.5–6.7, nearby Los Angeles High School was damaged severely and closed for repairs. Students from Los Angeles High attended Fairfax High on "double sessions", with Fairfax students using the campus from 7 am to 12 noon, and LA High students from 12:30 pm to 5 pm.

The Fairfax Magnet Center for Visual Arts opened in 1981 and remains the only visual arts magnet in the Los Angeles Unified School District.

In 1984, Dr. Virginia Uribe, founded LAUSD's Project 10 program, a dropout prevention program specifically for lesbian, gay, bisexual and transgender (LGBT) students in the United States.

Organized by a group of local theater artists, the first Melrose Trading Post flea market was held in 1996 in the school's parking lot. Regarded as the most successful on-going fund-raising activity in the LAUSD, the flea market evolved into the Greenway Arts Alliance, the Friends of Fairfax and the Institute for the Arts at Fairfax High School, all which are of immense benefit to the school and students.

== Demographics ==
As of the 2015–2016 school year, there were 2,108 students enrolled in Fairfax High School.

The racial/ethnic composition (as of the 2015–2016 school year) was as follows:

White	Latino	Asian	Black	Pacific Islander	American Indian	Two or more races
8%	55%	20%	17%	0.1%	0.4%	0%

According to U.S. News & World Report, 92% of Fairfax's student body is "of color", with 79% of the student body coming from economically disadvantaged households, determined by student eligibility for California's reduced-price meal program.

In the 1950s, Fairfax High School was known for having a large Jewish student body, as a Jewish community surrounded the school. It became known as a "Jewish" high school, and some non-Jewish parents withdrew their children from Fairfax as they felt discomfort with the Jewish character of the school. In 1953, Fairfax High introduced Modern Hebrew classes, initially taught by the principal of the Beverly-Fairfax Jewish Community Center, Ronnie Tofield.

The racial composition became significantly more multi-cultural following the integration efforts of 1968. As Fairfax principal William Layne told the Los Angeles Times in 1975, “Fairfax began changing in 1968. Then the boundaries were adjusted to include an area past Pico. It caused a trauma to what had been an all-white, academic school. There was strong reaction from the community as well. The senior citizens got upset when they saw a kid they couldn't identify with. There was also unrest at school, fearfulness, and an increase in thefts and people being molested."

Eventually, racial tensions subsided as the school worked toward an active integration plan led by Layne.

The table below represents the number of enrolled students at Fairfax High School through 2003–2007.

2003	2004	2005	2006	2007
2,838	2,949	3,131	3,174	2,889

== Small Learning Communities ==
Fairfax High School re-opened in fall 2008 reconfigured into a complex consisting of the existing Fairfax Magnet Center for Visual Arts and five new small learning communities (SLCs). The campus was divided into six areas of "contiguous space". Non-magnet students and staff were reorganized into five new schools-within-a-school. Subsequently, in 2010, two of the SLCs were replaced by a single SLC, bringing the total down to four SLCs and the Magnet. Currently, these SLCs are:

- Academy of Media & Performing Arts (AMPA)
- Academy of International Business and Communications (IBC)
- Health Sciences Academy (HSA)
- School of Mathematics, Science and Technology (SMST).

=== Fairfax Magnet Center for Visual Arts ===
Fairfax is home to the Fairfax Magnet Center for Visual Arts, which attracts students from across the 700 square miles (1,800 km^{2}) of the district. It opened in 1981 and is the only visual arts magnet in Los Angeles Unified School District.

== Greenway Arts Alliance ==
Fairfax High School's outer South side is home to the Greenway Arts Alliance (not an FHS entity), which operates the Greenway Court Theater, a 99-seat Equity-waiver playhouse, and through the Institute for the Arts at Greenway, provides non-LAUSD arts educational programs, mentoring, and employment opportunities to Fairfax students.

Since 1997, the Melrose Trading Post outdoor flea market has created opportunities for Fairfax High School and the surrounding neighborhood. Money raised by this nonprofit organization from the low-cost patron admission and vendor booth fees fuels an off-campus, arts education program called Institute for the Arts at Greenway.

== Notable alumni ==
- Byron Allen, Founder, chairman and CEO of Allen Media Group
- Herb Alpert (born 1935), musician, recording artist, music industry executive
- Michael "Flea" Balzary, musician, bassist, trumpet player (Red Hot Chili Peppers)
- Steve Barri, songwriter and record producer
- Jose Mari "Bong Revilla" Mortel Bautista Jr., Filipino actor and senator
- Saul Brandman (1925–2008), garment manufacturer
- Jamal Boykin, former basketball player
- Carol Connors, singer-songwriter
- Sir Cary Cooper, psychologist
- J. Curtis Counts (1915–1999), Director of the Federal Mediation and Conciliation Service
- George W. Dickerson, college football coach
- Boris Dralyuk, poet, editor, translator
- Diane Ellis, actress
- James Ellroy, author of L.A. Confidential
- Mike "SuperJew" Epstein (born 1943), former Major League Baseball player
- Danny Everett (born 1966), 1988 Olympic gold medalist 4 × 400 metres relay
- Wild Man Fischer, street performer
- Janet Fitch, author
- Manuel Franco, lawyer and judge from the television shows La Corte del Pueblo and Juez Franco
- Larry Friend (1935–1998), former National Basketball Association (NBA) player
- Rob Gardner, musician, L.A. Guns, founding drummer of Guns N' Roses
- Larry Gelbart, Emmy-winning, Oscar-nominated writer/producer, M*A*S*H
- Michele Greene, actress
- Rose Greene (1946–2019), financial planner and LGBT activist
- Homer Griffith, NFL tailback
- Thierry Guetta, street artist
- Tracii Guns, musician, L.A. Guns, founding guitarist of Guns N' Roses, whose surname was used in helping name the band
- Jim Hardy, former NFL quarterback
- Jerome Hines, opera singer
- Kathleen Hughes, actress
- Joe Hunt, tennis player
- Timothy Hutton, Oscar-winning actor
- Chanel Iman, model
- Jack Irons, musician, drummer (Red Hot Chili Peppers, Pearl Jam, The Wallflowers)
- Mike Jagosz (1965–2014), original lead vocalist for L.A. Guns and Pyrrhus
- David Janssen (1931–1980), actor, TV series The Fugitive and films
- Alain Johannes, musician (Anthym, Eleven)
- Sam Kane (born 1948), educator
- Gary Karr, classical double bassist
- Jack Kemp (1935–2009), U.S. Representative, 1996 Republican vice-presidential candidate and pro football quarterback for the Buffalo Bills
- Anthony Kiedis, musician, singer, writer (Red Hot Chili Peppers)
- Erwin Klein (d. 1992), table tennis player
- Annette Kleinbard (later changed her name to Carol Connors), lead singer of the Teddy Bears ("To Know Him Is to Love Him"). As Connors, co-wrote "Gonna Fly Now" from Rocky, and the Rip Chords' "Hey Little Cobra".
- Lenny Krayzelburg (born 1975, as Leonid Krayzelburg), backstroke swimmer, Olympic gold medalist, and former world record holder
- Mila Kunis (born 1983), actress
- Barry Latman (born 1936), Major League Baseball player
- Marshall Leib, singer
- Angelo Leo, boxer
- Jerome "Jerry" Leiber (1933–2011), lyricist of Jerry Leiber and Mike Stoller
- Cirroc Lofton, actor, Star Trek: Deep Space Nine
- Carole Lombard, Oscar-nominated actress
- Quinn Martin, producer
- Barry Miller, actor
- Roger Montgomery, basketball player and sports agent
- Demi Moore (born 1962), actress (dropped out at age 16)
- Ricardo Montalbán, actor, Fantasy Island, Star Trek II: The Wrath of Khan
- Marion Nestle (born 1936), molecular biologist, nutritionist, and public health advocate
- Mo Ostin (1927–2022), record executive and producer
- Baby Peggy, child actor, later author under name Diana Serra Cary; attended in the 1930s
- Burt Prelutsky (1940–2021), screenwriter, journalist and author
- Doria Ragland, mother of Meghan, Duchess of Sussex
- Mickey Rooney, Oscar-nominated actor featured in hundreds of Hollywood films
- Aaron Rosenberg (1912–1979), All-American college football player, and film and television producer
- Joe Ruby, co-creator of Scooby-Doo
- Ann Rutherford, actress
- Henry Samueli (born 1954), co-founder of Broadcom Corporation
- Doug Sax (1936–2015) Mastering engineer and co-founder of The Mastering Lab and Sheffield Lab record label.
- Allan Sherman, musician, parodist, satirist, and television producer
- Larry Sherry (1935–2006), Major League Baseball pitcher; MVP of the 1959 World Series
- Norm Sherry (1931–2021), Major League Baseball player and manager
- Al Silvera (1935–2002), Major League Baseball player
- Slash (Saul Hudson), musician, guitarist (Guns N' Roses, Velvet Revolver)
- P. F. Sloan (Philip Schlein), musician, songwriter ("Eve of Destruction", "Secret Agent Man"); graduated 1963
- Hillel Slovak, musician, guitarist (Red Hot Chili Peppers)
- Smear, contemporary artist, street artist
- Craig Smith, basketball player
- Ted Sobel, (born 1953), radio sportscaster & reporter KFWB, KNX, KMPC, Sports USA.
- Phil Spector, record producer
- Jack Spicer, poet and prominent figure in the San Francisco Renaissance
- Cynthia Szigeti, actress and improv teacher (The Groundlings)
- Shel Talmy record producer, songwriter and arranger
- Mike Thaler (1936-2024) author and illustrator
- Chris Thompson, TV producer and writer
- Roger Wagner, choral musician, administrator, and educator
- Chris Weber, musician, guitarist (Hollywood Rose)
- Marilyn Wilson-Rutherford (née Rovell), singer, The Honeys
- Zev Yaroslavsky, Los Angeles City Council member, 1975–1994 and Los Angeles County Supervisor, 1994–2014
- Tony Young, actor
- Warren Zevon, musician

== Sources ==
- Hartman, Kent (2012). The Wrecking Crew: The Inside Story of Rock and Roll's Best-Kept Secret. St. Martin's Press. ISBN 978-0-312-61974-9.
