= Sam Kane =

American educator

- Born: 1948 (age 77–78); Lodz, Poland
- Occupation: Former educator

Sam Kane, a former educator in the Conejo Valley Unified School District, is a Ventura County Educators’ Hall of Fame inductee. He has been honored by the California Legislature, California State Assembly, Johns Hopkins University, and Amgen. He is known for his teaching and counseling innovations, anti-bullying programs, and development of school bees and bowls.

== Early life ==
Kane was born in Lodz, Poland and lived in Israel before emigrating to the United States. He was raised in Boyle Heights, Los Angeles, California as well as the Fairfax District of Los Angeles. His father was a watchmaker and weaver by trade, at one time working as a weaver for textile designer Maria Kipp, and also running his own watchmaking and repair business. Kane's mother, a trained artist and graphic designer, worked part-time as a self-employed tailor.

== Education ==
Kane was a student at Roosevelt High School, where he was class president, and Fairfax High School. Kane attended UCLA, majoring in mathematics. He then transferred to California State University, Northridge (CSUN) so he could earn his teaching credential in mathematics, as UCLA did not have a teaching program at the time. He graduated from CSUN in 1972 with a B.A. in mathematics and a minor in journalism. He returned to CSUN to earn his Masters in Education, Educational Psychology, and Counseling & Guidance. In 1981, he earned his license in Marriage, Family, and Child Therapy.

== Career ==
Kane started privately tutoring students at age 16, which he continued until age 63; he founded a private learning center with his wife in 1981, tutoring grade school-aged students in pre-algebra, algebra, geometry, pre-calculus, calculus, and trigonometry, also conducting regular SAT prep courses. His wife tutored in English, pre-algebra, and algebra. His son would later tutor in 5th grade math, pre-algebra, algebra, and calculus.

Kane entered the teaching profession in 1970 at age 22, beginning his career at Sequoia Intermediate School, where he also became a counselor. At the time, the Conejo Valley Unified School District was called the Timber School District. Kane later took up the post as a math teacher at Redwood Intermediate and Moorpark College. A year later, the United States Jaycees (United States Junior Chamber) honored him with the Outstanding Young Educator award. In 1972, the California State Department of Education named him Teacher of the Year in the Conejo Valley. In 1972, Kane was first runner-up for Outstanding Young Educator in California. In 1974, the California Teachers Association bestowed Kane with the Merit Award for Innovative Development in the field of mathematics. Around this time, Kane was honored with an award for exemplary and innovative teaching at the California Good Teaching Conference in Oakland, California; out of 145,000 educators eligible, he was one of only ten awarded.

In 1983, Kane joined the staff of Colina Intermediate School, later known as Colina Middle School. He served as counselor and teacher for his initial five years and went on to serve as counselor for the following 20 years. He also acted as technology director. In 1989, Johns Hopkins University honored him as a fellow with their award for exemplary work in the field of education; he was the only counselor up to that time to be given the honor.

In 1994, Kane was the recipient of the Amgen Award for Teacher Excellence, the only counselor to ever be bestowed the honor. In 2004 he was recognized by the California Senate in the field of education. The same year, he was honored by the Conejo/Las Virgenes Future Foundation. He was also recognized by the California State Assembly and Assemblywoman of the 41st District, Fran Pavley, for his position as a finalist for Conejo/Las Virgenes Future Foundation's award in the field of education.

In 2005, Kane was the recipient of the prestigious Golden Oak Service Award, an honor given by the California Congress of Parents, Teachers, and Students, Inc. In 2007, a longtime colleague nominated him for Hardest Worker in Ventura County; he was one of 58 nominees. In 2008, Colina Middle School honored him with the Lifetime Achievement Award for Educational Excellence. Also in 2008, the parent of one of his students nominated him for Hardest Worker in Ventura County; Kane was named one of ten finalists. In 2009, he was honored by Assemblywoman of the 37th District Audra Strickland and the California Legislature for outstanding service in education. The same year, the Ventura County Board of Supervisors recognized him for his years of service to youth.

From 2009 through 2020, Kane worked at Conejo Valley Adult School as counselor and evening administrator. Additionally, he served as Learning Center coordinator and chief test center administrator for GED, CBEST, CSET, HiSET, IT, and teacher credentialing examinations. He was also SAT Prep Program coordinator.

From 2009 to 2011, Kane served as a supervisor for the U.S. Department of Education's National Assessment of Educational Progress (NAEP), also known as "The Nation's Report Card," for which he traveled to 44 schools, across multiple districts throughout Southern California, to conduct in-person school and student assessments. He oversaw a personnel contingent of 10 while also working with approximately 60 principals, vice principals, and teachers at aforementioned schools.

For the years 2012, 2015, and 2018, Kane chaired the Western Association of Schools and Colleges (WASC) accreditation committee for Conejo Valley Adult School; he had previously served as a WASC chair in the 1970s.

In 2022, after 51 years of service as a teacher, school counselor, and administrator, Kane was inducted into the Ventura County Educators’ Hall of Fame.

== In media ==
Kane's innovative work has been covered in the Ventura County Star and the Los Angeles Times; a November 14, 1982 Star article titled "Stress: Children today face adult problems" featured Kane's perspective on latch-key kids, mental health, classism, parenting styles, and divorce's effects on children, while a February 8, 1998 Times article, "the No-Excuses, Hotline for Homework," featured Kane's development of an online homework hotline in the early stages of public internet use. In a December 13, 2000 Star article, "School's Web site gets work done," Kane's development of said hotline was featured.

On December 25, 2000, Kane was again featured in the Star with the article "Top of the Class: Thatcher, Colina, Knolls Web sites take top honors;" as webmaster, Kane created and developed Colina Middle School's site for which he and the school were awarded the 2001 Ventura County Star's Best Middle School Internet Site.

== Philanthropy ==
Kane is a former volunteer docent of the Simon Wiesenthal Museum of Tolerance. He is also a former West Valley Food Pantry volunteer. He is currently a sponsor of a young adult in Zambia whose group home is part of the charitable organization Arise Africa.

== Personal life ==
Kane has been married since 1977 and has two children.
