= Banyan Elementary School =

Banyan Elementary School may refer to:

- Banyan Elementary School (Newbury Park, California)
- Banyan Elementary School (Miami, Florida)
- Banyan Elementary School (Sunrise, Florida)
