= Weathersfield =

Weathersfield may refer to:

- Weathersfield Elementary School - school located in Thousand Oaks, California
- Weathersfield Township, Trumbull County, Ohio — located in northeastern Ohio, near Youngstown
- Weathersfield, Vermont — town in Windsor County, Vermont

== See also ==
- Wethersfield (disambiguation)
- Weatherfield, fictional setting of Coronation Street
