= Capitol Records =

American record label

- Parent company: Universal Music Group (2012–present); Previously; EMI (1955–1979; 1996–2012); Thorn EMI (1979–1996)
- Founded: March 27, 1942; 84 years ago (as Liberty Records); April 8, 1942; 84 years ago (as Capitol Records)
- Founder: Johnny Mercer; Buddy DeSylva; Glenn Wallichs
- Distributors: Interscope Capitol Labels Group (US); Capitol UK/Polydor Label Group (United Kingdom); Universal Music Japan (Japan); Universal Music Group (International); Universal Music Enterprises (Reissues)
- Genre: Various
- Country of origin: United States
- Location: Capitol Records Building, 1750 Vine Street Hollywood, California, 90028, U.S.
- Official website: capitolrecords.com

Capitol Records, LLC (known legally as Capitol Records, Inc. until 2007 and simply referred to as Capitol) is an American record label owned by Universal Music Group (UMG) through its Capitol Music Group imprint. It was founded as the first West Coast-based record label of note in the United States in 1942 by Johnny Mercer, Buddy DeSylva, and Glenn E. Wallichs. Capitol was acquired by British music conglomerate EMI as its North American subsidiary in 1955. EMI was acquired by Universal Music Group in 2012 and underwent a merger with the company a year later, making Capitol and the Capitol Music Group both distributed by UMG. The label's headquarters, the Capitol Records Building, is a recognized landmark of Hollywood, Los Angeles, California.

== History ==
=== Founding ===
Songwriter Johnny Mercer founded Capitol Records in 1942 with financial help from songwriter and film producer Buddy DeSylva and the business acumen of Glenn Wallichs, owner of Wallichs Music City. Mercer raised the idea of starting a record company while golfing with Harold Arlen and Bobby Sherwood and with Wallichs at Wallichs's record store. On February 2, 1942, Mercer and Wallichs met DeSylva at a restaurant in Hollywood to talk about investment by Paramount Pictures.

On March 27, 1942, the three men incorporated as Liberty Records (not affiliated with Capitol's future sister label Liberty Records). In May, the application was amended to change the label's name to Capitol Records.

On April 6, 1942, Mercer supervised Capitol's first recording session, where Martha Tilton recorded the song "Moon Dreams". On May 5, Bobby Sherwood and his orchestra recorded two tracks in the studio. On May 21, Freddie Slack and his orchestra recorded three tracks in the studio: one with the orchestra, one with Ella Mae Morse called "Cow-Cow Boogie" and "Air-Minded Executive" supervised by Mercer. On June 4, Capitol opened its first office in a second-floor room south of Sunset Boulevard. On that same day, Wallichs presented the company's first free record to Los Angeles disc jockey Peter Potter. On June 5, Paul Whiteman and his orchestra recorded four songs at the studio. On June 12, the orchestra recorded five more songs in the studio, including "Trav'lin' Light" with Billie Holiday. On June 11, Tex Ritter recorded "Jingle Jangle Jingle" and "Goodbye My Little Cherokee" for his first Capitol recording session, and the songs comprised Capitol's 110th produced record.

The earliest recording artists included co-owner Mercer, Johnnie Johnston, Morse, Jo Stafford, the Pied Pipers, Tex Ritter, Tilton, Paul Weston, Whiteman, and Margaret Whiting. Capitol's first gold single was Morse's "Cow Cow Boogie" in 1942.

Capitol's first album, A-1, was Capitol Presents Songs by Johnny Mercer, a four-disc set with recordings by Mercer, Stafford, and the Pied Pipers, all accompanied by Weston's orchestra.

Capitol was the first significant West Coast label to compete with major labels on the East Coast such as RCA Victor, Columbia, and Decca. In addition to its Los Angeles recording studios, Capitol owned a second studio in New York City and occasionally sent mobile recording equipment to other cities.

=== Other genres ===
In 1946, writer-producer Alan W. Livingston created Bozo the Clown for the company's children's record library, with Pinto Colvig (the voice of Goofy in Walt Disney cartoons) as Bozo. Mel Blanc reprised his own cartoon roles including Bugs Bunny and other Looney Tunes characters, as well as Woody Woodpecker, while several Disney records were narrated by radio announcer Don Wilson. Examples of notable Capitol albums for children during that era are Sparky's Magic Piano and Rusty in Orchestraville. Capitol also developed a noted jazz catalog that included the Capitol Jazz Men and issued the Miles Davis's album Birth of the Cool.

Capitol released several classical albums in the 1940s, some of which contained handsome heavily embossed leather-like covers. These recordings appeared on the 78 rpm format and were subsequently reissued on the new LP format in 1949. Among the recordings: Brazilian composer Heitor Villa-Lobos' Choros No. 10, with contributions from a Los Angeles choral group and the Janssen Symphony Orchestra (1940–1952), conducted by Werner Janssen; Symphony No. 3 by Russian composer Reinhold Moritzovich Glière; and César Franck's Symphony in D minor, with Willem Mengelberg and the Concertgebouw Orchestra.

In 1949, Capitol opened a branch office in Canada and purchased KHJ Studios on Melrose Avenue adjacent to Paramount in Hollywood.

By the 1950s, Capitol had become a huge label that concentrated primarily on popular music.

Capitol began recording rock and roll acts such as The Jodimars and Gene Vincent. There were comedy records by Stan Freberg, Johnny Standley, and Mickey Katz. On August 2, 1952, Billboard magazine contained a chronicle of the label's first ten years in business.

=== Ownership under EMI ===
Capitol logo from 1969 to 1978, designed by Roland Young. Revived in 2017

In 1955, the British record company EMI (Electric and Musical Industries Limited) purchased Capitol Records, ending the 55-year mutual distribution agreement between EMI and RCA Victor in the Western Hemisphere in 1957. EMI acquired 96% of Capitol's stock for $8.5 million. EMI built a studio at Hollywood and Vine to match its state-of-the-art Abbey Road Studios in London.

In the 1950s, Decca Records broke its distribution contract with Panart, the first independent Cuban record company. This provided an opening for Capitol, which then contracted with Panart to have Capitol and Odeon records distributed in Cuba. In turn, Capitol distributed Panart records in the United States, growing its export percentage from 20 to 50 percent. This was a coup for Capitol, as RCA Victor up to this point had huge predominance in the United States distribution of Cuban music recordings.

In 1957, EMI's classical label Angel was merged into Capitol. Some classical recordings were issued in high fidelity and stereophonic sound. These included William Steinberg and the Pittsburgh Symphony Orchestra, Leopold Stokowski with various orchestras (including the Los Angeles Philharmonic Orchestra), and Sir Thomas Beecham and the Royal Philharmonic Orchestra, as well as light classical albums by Carmen Dragon and the Hollywood Bowl Orchestra and albums of film music conducted by Hollywood composers such as Alfred Newman.

In the realm of sweet jazz big-band music, Capitol also joined forces with the bandleader Guy Lombardo starting in the mid-1950s to issue a series of approximately thirty recordings until the late 1960s.

The Capitol of the World series, introduced in 1956 and active into the 1970s, encompassed German Beer Drinking Songs, Honeymoon in Rome, Australian Aboriginals, and Kasongo! Modern Music of the Belgian Congo. Many were produced by Dave Dexter Jr. This series contained over 400 albums. It was also in this period that Capitol issued Christmas music recordings from various countries outside the United States. In the 1960s, Capitol established subsidiary labels including Tower Records. Capitol was the US distributor of the Beatles' Apple Records.

In October 1979, EMI merged with Thorn Electrical Industries to form Thorn EMI, and, due to business models increasingly diverging, on August 16, 1996, Thorn EMI's shareholders voted to demerge. The resulting media company was then known as the EMI Group. In June 1997, Capitol, together with Virgin Records, absorbed EMI USA, which folded.

In 2007, Capitol underwent a restructuring process due to the acquisition of its parent company EMI by Terra Firma Capital Partners, which resulted in Capitol incorporating all American branches of EMI and their respective catalogs (including the Virgin and Chrysalis Records branches in the United States) and changing the registration name from a public company to a private company and the creation of Capitol Music Group in the same year to help manage the catalog.

Some American recordings originally owned by Capitol by international artists such as Tina Turner, Joe Cocker, and the band Kraftwerk were merged with EMI Records/Parlophone years before the sale of EMI Group to Universal Music, were included in the Parlophone Label Group (PLG), and were sold to Warner in 2013.

=== Distribution under Universal Music Group ===
In 2012, the recorded music operations of EMI were sold to the Universal Music Group, and the world headquarters were re-established in the Capitol Tower in Hollywood as part of the subsequent reorganization of the Capitol Music Group. Steve Barnett, previously an employee of Columbia, was hired as chairman and CEO of the division.

Capitol filed a lawsuit against Vimeo, an online video-sharing website, for audio copyright infringement. Capitol filed the claim after users were visibly lip-syncing to some of their tracks.

Following legal action by Capitol against the ReDigi.com online company in April 2013, the latter was found to have violated copyright law. Capitol Records claimed that ReDigi was guilty of copyright infringement due to a business model that facilitated the creation of additional copies of Capitol's digital music files, whereby users could upload the files for downloading or streaming to the new purchaser of the file. ReDigi argued that the resale of MP3/digital music files is permitted under certain doctrines ("fair use" and "first sale"), but the court maintained that the doctrines' application "was limited to material items that the copyright owner put into the stream of commerce."

In 2014, PGH Live Music joined the team, and Katy Perry founded the record label Metamorphosis Music, starting a label venture with Capitol. The name of the label was later changed to Unsub Records in 2016.

Also that year, Capitol rose to number two in market share and won four categories at the Grammy Awards for music by Beck and Sam Smith.

In 2018, Capitol's electronic division Astralwerks relaunched with a new team and moved its entire operations to Capitol's tower in Los Angeles.

In 2019, Jeff Vaughn was named President of Capitol Records, assuming his position as of January 1, 2020.

In 2021, Michelle Jubelirer was named the chair & CEO of Capitol.

In 2024, Capitol Records became part of UMG's Interscope Capitol Labels Group.

On December 17, 2025, Universal Music Japan announced it would relaunch its own Capitol Records label for domestic artists. The label launched on January 1, 2026.

== Headquarters ==
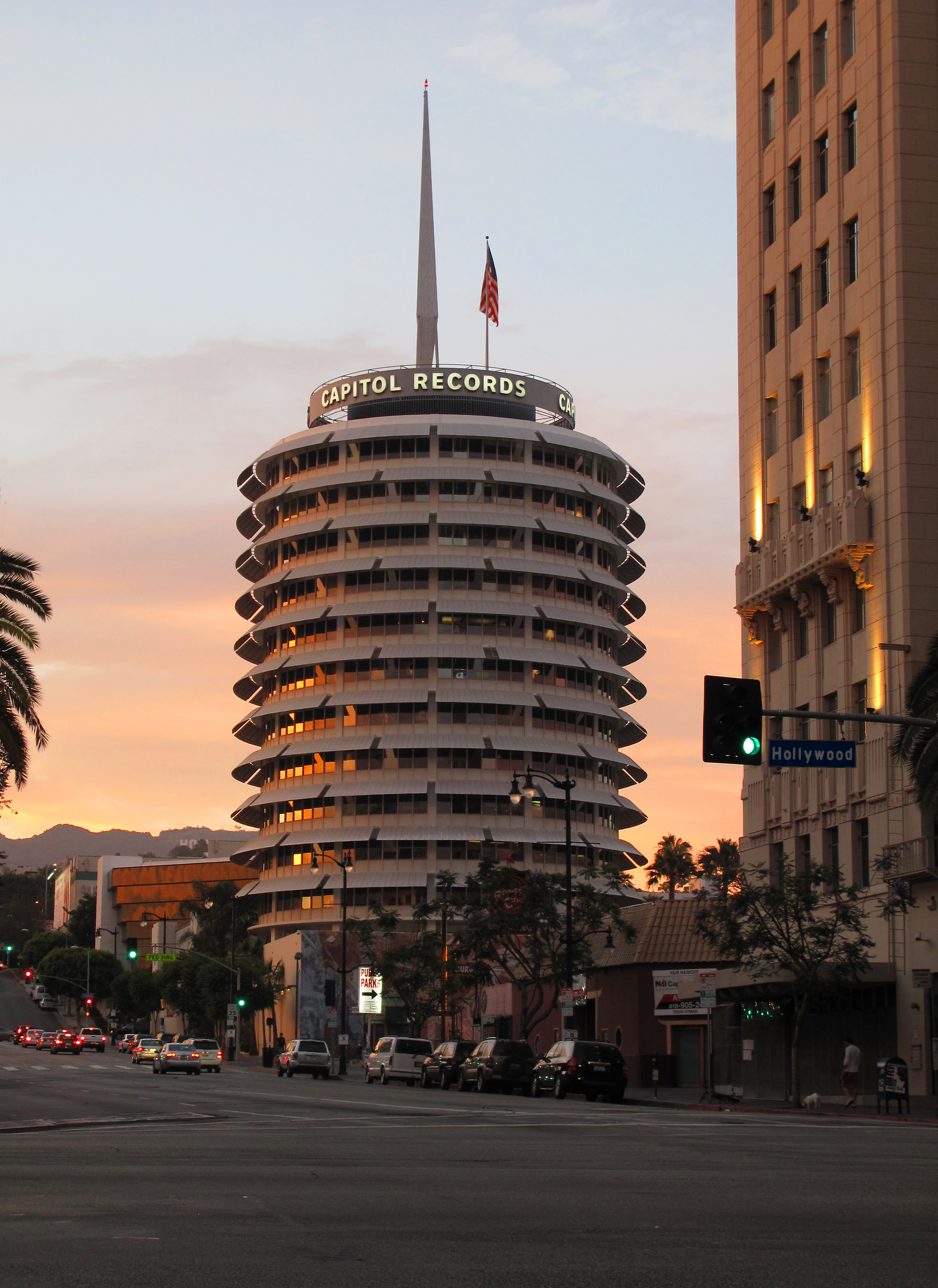
Capitol Records headquarters building in Hollywood

Designed by Welton Becket with Louis Naidorf, a young architect from Becket's office serving as project designer, the thirteen-story, earthquake-resistant Capitol Records Tower was the world's first circular office building, and it is the base for several recording studios. Although not intended as a tribute to record players, its wide curved awnings and tall narrow tower mimic the appearance of a stack of gramophone records atop a phonograph. The building was commissioned by EMI after its acquisition of Capitol Records in 1955 and was completed in April 1956. The building is north of the intersection of Hollywood and Vine and is the center of the company's consolidated West Coast operations. It was nicknamed "The House That Nat Built" after the financial success of Capitol singer Nat King Cole. The rectangular ground floor is a separate structure joined to the tower after it was completed.

In September 2006, EMI announced that it had sold the tower and adjacent properties for $50 million to New York-based developer Argent Ventures. In mid-2008, a controversy erupted over a plan to build a condominium complex next door, igniting fears that the building's acoustic properties, specifically its underground echo chambers, would be compromised. It was announced in November 2012 that Steve Barnett would become chairman and CEO of Capitol Music Group and would be based at the Capitol Records Building. Capitol and artist Richard Wyatt Jr. restored his Hollywood Jazz Mural on the south wall of the Capitol Records Building.

== Studios ==
Capitol's recording studios were designed to minimize noise and vibration, which were newly crucial goals in the high-fidelity sound era. An inner wall floating on layers of rubber and cork was erected inside the building's 10-inch-thick (250 mm) concrete exterior walls, leaving a one-inch air gap to provide complete sound isolation. The facility also features subterranean echo chambers that allow engineers to add reverberation during the recording process. Eight trapezoidal chambers are located 30 feet (9.1 m) underground, with 10-inch concrete walls and 12-inch-thick (300 mm) concrete ceilings. Speakers on one side and microphones on the other permit an echo effect of up to five seconds. Studios A and B can be combined for the recording of orchestral music and symphonic film soundtracks. The first album recorded in the tower was Frank Sinatra Conducts Tone Poems of Color.

== International operations ==
Capitol modified albums that were originally released in other countries on other labels. Albums released in the United States contained fewer tracks, usually no more than 11 or 12, compared to albums released in the United Kingdom, due to differences in how publishing royalties were calculated in the two countries. Also, in the American market it was expected that albums would include the current hit single, whereas British albums typically did not duplicate songs released as singles.

=== The Beatles ===
Capitol released various albums by the Beatles.

=== United Kingdom ===
Beginning in 1948, Capitol Records were released in the UK on the Capitol label by Decca. After its 1955 acquisition of Capitol, EMI took over distribution in 1956. EMI's Parlophone unit handled Capitol label marketing in the UK in later years.

In 2012, EMI was sold to Universal Music Group. Universal Music started Capitol as an autonomous label in the UK with the rights to the Beatles' catalog. This marks the first time that Capitol in the UK operated as an autonomous label.

=== Canada ===
Capitol Records of Canada was established in 1949 by businessman W. Lockwood Miller. Capitol broke with Miller's company and formed Capitol Record Distributors of Canada Limited in 1954. EMI acquired this company when it acquired Capitol. The company was renamed Capitol Records of Canada Ltd. in 1958 after Miller's rights to the name expired. In 1959, Capitol of Canada picked up distribution rights for EMI's labels Angel, Pathé, Odeon, and Parlophone.

In 1957, Paul White joined Capitol of Canada and, in 1960, established an A&R department independent of the American company to promote talent for the Canadian market. The division found native talent such as Anne Murray and EMI musicians from other countries. Beginning in 1962, Capitol of Canada issued albums by British musicians such as Cliff Richard, Helen Shapiro, and Frank Ifield. They accepted the Beatles long before the American company. By 1967, it was distributing non-EMI labels such as 20th Century Fox, Buena Vista Records, Disneyland, and Pickwick. The company was renamed Capitol Records-EMI of Canada in 1974, before the EMI Music Canada name was adopted in 1993. EMI Music Canada was absorbed into Universal Music Canada in 2012. In 2016, Universal Music Canada donated the EMI Music Canada archives to the University of Calgary.

=== Other countries ===
Capitol Latin focuses on Latin music artists in Latin America and the United States. It was founded in 1989 as EMI Latin and was renamed to Capitol Latin in 2009. Capitol Latin was merged with Universal Music Latin Entertainment in 2013.

Capitol Records of Mexico was founded in 1965 as the Mexican division of Capitol. EMI later renamed the label EMI Capitol of Mexico until it later became simply EMI's local company, EMI Music Mexico. Since 2012, after Universal Music Group purchased EMI, the Mexican EMI brand, music catalog, and office are owned by Universal Music México.

Capitol Music Germany was founded by EMI Music Germany and inherited most of EMI's German artists' catalog. In 2013, Capitol Germany was acquired by Universal and merged with UMG's Vertigo Berlin domestic division. The new label is called Vertigo/Capitol.

Capitol Music Group Sweden was relaunched in 2015 after UMG rebranded the Lionheart Music Group label. It originally existed as a division of EMI Music Sweden during the 1990s and mid-2000s. EMI's Swedish offices were included in the Parlophone Label Group sale and were acquired by Warner Music Group, which owns Capitol Sweden's back catalog.

In France, Capitol Label Services (formerly Capitol Music France) exists as a division of Universal Music France and bears the 1970s Capitol "C" logo.

== See also ==
- Capitol Records Nashville
- Capitol Records, Inc. v. Naxos of America, Inc.
- List of Capitol Records artists
- List of record labels
