= Michelle Jubelirer =

American music executive

- Born: Pittsburgh, Pennsylvania
- Education: University of North Carolina at Chapel Hill; Fordham University School of Law
- Occupations: Music industry executive and attorney
- Children: 1
- Awards: Billboard Power 100; 2024 Executive of the Year, Billboard Women in Music

Michelle Jubelirer is an American music industry executive and attorney based in Los Angeles. She was the chairperson and CEO of Capitol Music Group from 2021 to 2024, the first woman to lead CMG in its 80-year history. Jubelirer was named 2024 Executive of the Year at Billboard magazine's annual Women in Music event. She is a co-founder of the talent management and media collective Soft Shock.

== Early life and education ==
Jubelirer was born in Pittsburgh, Pennsylvania. Her father, a criminal defense attorney, died unexpectedly when she was 3 years old. When she was in fourth grade, her mother remarried and the family moved to Altoona, Pennsylvania.

Jubelirer earned a bachelor's degree at the University of North Carolina at Chapel Hill, and a J.D. degree at Fordham University School of Law. While at Fordham, she interned at the Manhattan District Attorney's office.

== Career ==
=== Early career (1999-2012) ===
Jubelirer began her career in 1999 as a mergers and acquisitions attorney at the New York law firm Simpson, Thacher & Barlett. She joined Sony Music as an in-house attorney in 2003, before relocating to Los Angeles in 2005 to join entertainment law firm King, Holmes, Paterno & Berliner, becoming a partner there. During her eight years at King, Holmes, Paterno & Berliner, Jubelirer represented clients including Pharrell Williams, Nas, Frank Ocean, M.I.A., Odd Future / Tyler, the Creator, Ke$ha, The Gossip, Swedish House Mafia, Avicii, Marilyn Manson, Yeah Yeah Yeahs and Damian Marley.

=== Capitol Music Group (2013-2024) ===
In 2013, Jubelirer joined Capitol Music Group as executive vice president, to help set the creative direction of the new label, quickly rising to second in command under then-CEO Steve Barnett. In 2015, she was promoted to chief operating officer, adding the title of president in 2020. In December 2021, she was named chair and CEO, becoming the first female chief executive in Capitol's 80-plus-year history. When she took over leadership of CMG, the label was facing a falling market share, staff turnover, challenges from the COVID-19 pandemic, and an unwieldy artist roster. Under her guidance, the label won a bidding war for Ice Spice, had a number one song on the Billboard Hot 100 with "Unholy" by Sam Smith, had a viral TikTok hit with Doechii's "What It Is (Block Boy)", and released the new Beatles single "Now and Then". Doechii was the first big signing of her tenure, and she was also involved with bringing Halsey, Beck, Toosii, Neil Diamond, and Paul McCartney to CMG.

On February 6, 2024, it was reported that Jubelirer would step down as chairman and CEO of Capitol Music Group.

=== Soft Shock (2025-present) ===
Jubelirer and former Capitol Music Group president Arjun Pulijal are the co-founders of Soft Shock, a talent management and media collective, which was announced on September 18, 2025. The company focuses on artist management, marketing, branding, and IP development.

== Personal life ==
Jubelirer lives with her partner, musician Keith Nelson, a founding member and former lead guitarist of rock band Buckcherry, and their son.
