= Wethersfield =

Wethersfield may refer to the following places:

- Wethersfield, Essex, an English village near RAF Wethersfield
  - RAF Wethersfield, a British Ministry of Defence training facility in Essex, England
- Wethersfield, Connecticut, United States
- Wethersfield, New York, United States
- Wethersfield Township, Henry County, Illinois

== See also ==
- Weathersfield (disambiguation)
