= Jeff Vaughn =

American music executive

Jeff Vaughn is an American music executive. He is the founder and CEO of Signal Records, a joint venture with Columbia Records. Until 2021, he was the chairman and CEO of Capitol Music Group. He was the featured executive in Billboard's 40 Under 40 list in 2021.

== Early life and education ==
Vaughn was born in Virginia. He graduated from Duke University.

== Career ==
Vaughn started his career at United Talent Agency. In 2011, he joined newly launched Artist Partner Group, then a joint venture with Atlantic Records. During his time at Artist Partner Group, he signed and worked closely with hip hop/R&B powerhouses Youngboy Never Broke Again, Kehlani, Kevin Gates, NLE Choppa, NoCap, Rico Nasty, Lil Skies and Don Toliver, among others. He was also instrumental in the signing of Young Thug to Atlantic.

In 2020, he became the president of Capitol Records, and became chairman and CEO of Capitol Music Group the next year. Under his leadership, the label signed RIAA multi-platinum certified artist Toosii and Kay Flock and secured the label's first No. 1 album on Billboard's Top R&B Albums Chart in decades with Queen Naija's missunderstood album. The label also saw success with numerous RIAA multi-platinum and platinum certified releases from new artists, including Capella Grey's Gyalis, Surf Mesa's ily (i love you baby) and Mooski's Track Star.

He was honored in the cover story of Billboard’s 40 Under 40 list in 2021 for reinvigorating the Capitol roster and expanding the label’s investments in hip hop and R&B.

In 2022, he founded the Los Angeles-based record label Signal Records and became its CEO.
