= Conejo Valley Adult School =

Public adult school in Thousand Oaks, California, United States

Coordinates: 34.20516°N 118.86136°W

Location
- 1025 Old Farm Road; Thousand Oaks, California; United States

Information
- Type: public (adult school)
- School district: Conejo Valley Unified School District
- Principal: Jason Klinger
- Campus type: Suburban
- Website: www.conejoadultschool.org

Conejo Valley Adult Education (CVAE) is a public California Adult School in Thousand Oaks, California, part of the Conejo Valley Unified School District. It is the only adult education campus in the district. The school's principal is Mike Sanders. The school is accredited by the Western Association of Schools and Colleges (WASC), the accrediting body for schools and colleges in the Western United States and territories.

== Programs offered ==
- Computer Certificate Programs & Courses
- Medical Certificate Programs & Courses, including Phlebotomy Technician, Pharmacy Technician, Physical Therapy Aide, Certified Caregiver, EKG Technician, Electronic Medical Records
- High School Equivalency Preparation
- Adult and Concurrent High School Diploma Programs
- Bridge Program (to transition to community college or vocational training)
- SAT & ACT Prep
- ESL Programs
- Literacy Program
- Parent Education Program
- Senior Adult Enrichment Classes (e.g., drawing, painting, needlework, Spanish, dance, yoga)
- Community Enrichment classes (e.g., career development and exploration, finance, fine arts, foreign language, home & garden, dance & music, writing, fitness & sport, food & nutrition)
