= Capitol Music Group =

American umbrella label owned by Universal Music Group

- Parent company: Universal Music Group
- Founded: February 2007; 19 years ago
- Founder: EMI
- Distributors: Interscope Capitol Labels Group (United States); Universal Music Group (International)
- Genre: Various
- Country of origin: United States
- Location: Hollywood, California
- Official website: www.capitolmusicgroup.com

Capitol Music Group is an American umbrella label that operates as a unit of the Interscope Capitol Labels Group, a division of Universal Music Group (UMG). Inherited from UMG's acquisition of EMI's catalog in 2013, it oversees the handling of record labels assigned to UMG's Capitol Records division. As of 2024, it is one of the two umbrella labels that make up the Interscope Capitol Labels Group, the other being Interscope Geffen A&M.

== History ==
=== 2007–2010: Formation and success ===
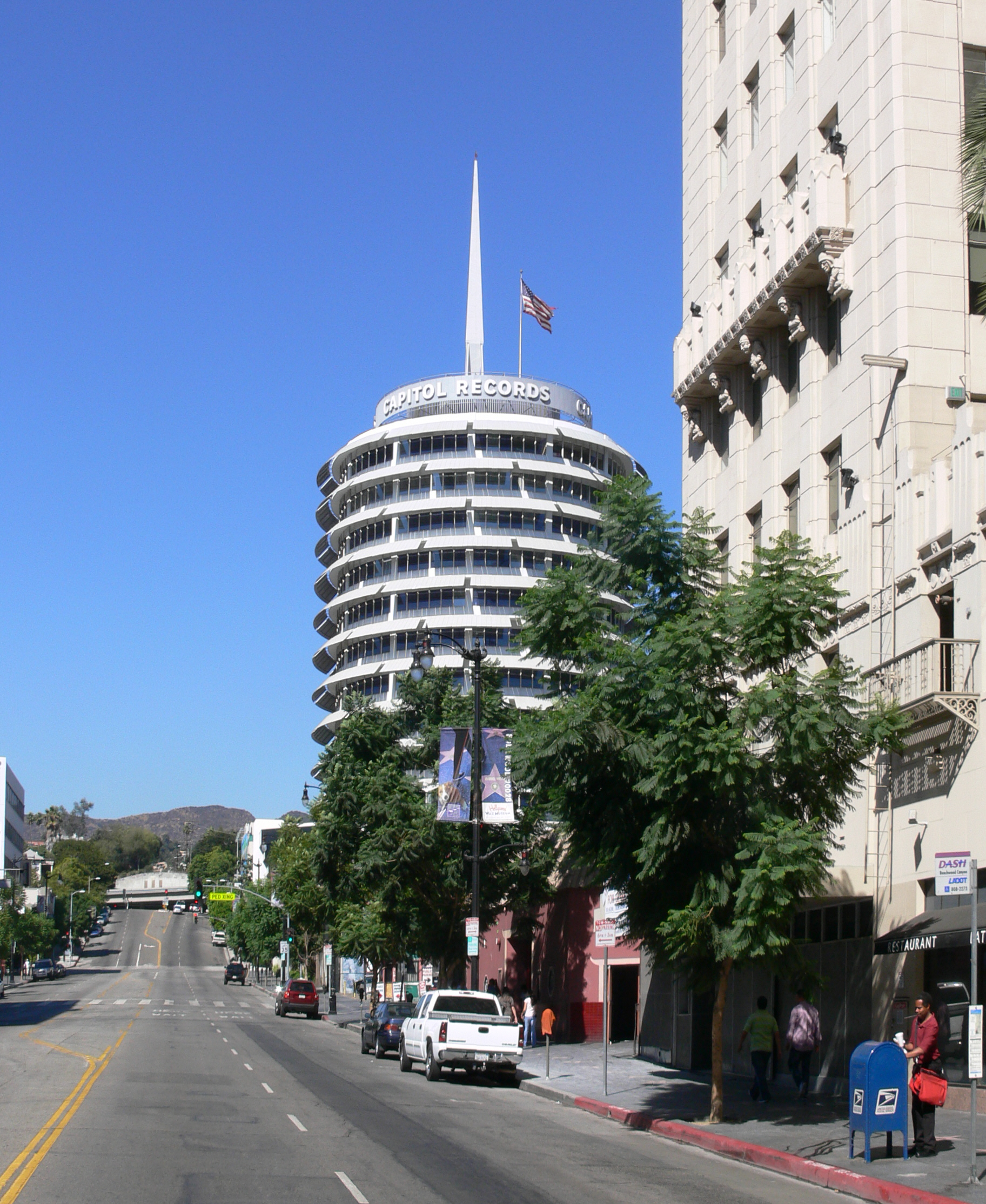
The Capitol Music Group's headquarters are located at the Capitol Records Building in Hollywood.

Capitol Music Group was formed in February 2007 as a merger of Capitol Records and Virgin Records America in an effort by EMI to restructure and save an average of $217 million yearly. Both Virgin Records and Capitol Records, however, remained imprints of the label.

Virgin Records CEO Jason Flom was named the head of the division, with Capitol Records CEO Andy Slater resigning after receiving a pension reportedly worth more than $15 million. As the head of the label, Flom reported directly to EMI Group CEO Eric Nicoli.

=== 2010–2013: Spinoff from Virgin Records and reorganization ===
In 2010, Virgin Records was spun off from Capitol Music Group (CMG) to form Virgin Music Group; as of 2013, however, the Virgin Music Group was dissolved, resulting in Virgin Records returning to its placement under CMG.

=== 2012–2021: Closure of EMI and UMG acquisition ===
In November 2012, it was announced that Steve Barnett would become the chairman and CEO of the company.

With EMI's absorption (sans Parlophone) into Universal Music Group complete, Capitol Music Group became part of UMG's five label units in the UK. The Beatles appeared on Capitol UK.

In November 2020, Jeff Vaughn was named Chairman/CEO. He was replaced by Michelle Jubelirer in 2021.

=== 2024–present: Interscope Capitol Labels Group ===
In February 2024, Jubilerer resigned and Tom March, previously the head of Geffen Records, was named CEO and chairman. CMG and IGA later combined their operations to form Interscope Capitol Labels Group following corporate restucturing.

== Sub-labels ==
- Capitol Records
- Blue Note Records
- EMI
- Astralwerks
- Harvest Records
- Capitol Christian Music Group

== Labels managed ==
Through flagship label Capitol, CMG handles the back catalogs and has assumed the copyrights of master recordings from the following labels and sub-labels acquired or distributed by UMG's predecessor EMI throughout its existence:

- 3C Records
- Aladdin Records
- Amada Records
- Angel Records (US)
- Apple Records
- Ascot Records
- Blue Thumb Records (1970–71 titles distributed by Capitol)
- Chrysalis Records (US & Canada and rest of the world outside the UK)
- DCP International
- Dolton Records
- EMI America Records
- EMI Records (US until 1997; Canada)
- Enigma Records
- Freedom Records (1950s)
- Fader Label
- Harvest Records
- Imperial Records (until 1970)
- I.R.S. Records
- Laurie Records
- Liberty Records (North America, until 1970; 1980s)
- Manhattan Records (1980s)
- Mediarts Records
- Minit Records
- Nocturne Records
- Pacific Jazz Records
- SBK Records
- Shelter Records (distributed by Capitol between 1970 and 1973)
- Solid State Records (1960s)
- Sue Records
- Unart Records
- United Artists Records (North America)
- Veep Records
- Virgin Records America

== See also ==
- List of record labels
- Universal Music Group
