= Steve Barnett (music executive) =

American music executive (born 1952)

Steve Barnett is the former chairman and CEO of Capitol Music Group.

== Early career ==
Barnett began his music career as an agent in London in 1970, working for the Bron Agency (Gerry Bron) and dealing with bands such as Colosseum and Uriah Heep. He became an agent for NEMS Enterprises, the company originally formed by Beatles manager Brian Epstein. While there from 1972 to 1974, Barnett represented artists such as Elton John, Black Sabbath, and Deep Purple. He briefly managed Rough Diamond in 1977, a short-lived British band that featured David Byron (ex Uriah Heep), Dave Clempson (ex Colosseum), and Geoff Britton (ex Wings). In 1980 he became a manager and partner in the U.K. artist management firm Part Rock, where his clients included AC/DC, Cyndi Lauper, Foreigner, and Gary Moore. In 1988 he established Part Rock's U.S. company, Hard to Handle Management, where he served as President.

== Epic Records ==
Barnett joined Epic Records in 1996 as Senior Vice President International, and was named Senior Vice President Worldwide Marketing for the label in 1997, then Executive Vice President/ General Manager in 2001. He was named President of Epic in 2004. At Epic Barnett took a role in marketing artists including Pearl Jam, Audioslave, Shakira, Jennifer Lopez, Franz Ferdinand, Modest Mouse, Good Charlotte and Natasha Bedingfield.

== Columbia Records ==
In December 2005, he was named Chairman of Columbia Records, with responsibility for overall management of the label. During his tenure, Columbia's marketshare rose consistently, resulting in a 50 percent increase in current marketshare between 2009 and 2012 and attaining the #1 slot among all labels in 2011 and 2012.

Barnett has presided over successful campaigns for Adele, Beyoncé, John Mayer, Jack White, The Shins, One Direction, Maxwell, Foster the People, J. Cole, AC/DC, Susan Boyle, soprano prodigy Jackie Evancho and the marketing and release of the Glee soundtracks. He oversaw critically acclaimed and commercially successful albums by artists including Bob Dylan, Bruce Springsteen, Barbra Streisand, Neil Diamond, Celine Dion, and Harry Connick Jr.

Adele's 21 was the first time that an album reached the RIAA Diamond plateau since Usher's Confessions, which was released in 2004 and Diamond certified in July, 2012.

This period also saw Bob Dylan score back-to-back #1 albums with Modern Times and Together Through Life, as well as Neil Diamond receiving the first #1 album in his career with the release of Home Before Dark. During this time, Barbra Streisand set the record as the only artist to achieve a #1 album in every decade from the 1960s through the 2000s with her album Love Is the Answer.

== Capitol Music Group ==
=== 2012 - 2014 ===
In November 2012, Barnett became chairman and CEO of the Capitol Music Group. Barnett broadened the company's portfolio of labels in 2013, inking high-profile deals with T Bone Burnett (Electromagnetic Recordings) and Troy Carter (Atom Factory), as well as a partnership with Arcade Fire for that band's Reflektor album.

In October 2013, it was announced that Beck signed to Capitol Records. On January 21, 2014, Barnett announced the signing of Neil Diamond to a long-term recording agreement with Capitol Records. The contract united Diamond's Columbia, UNI/MCA, and Bang catalogues of recorded music for the first time, encompassing the artist's entire body of recorded work.

In December, 2013, Barnett completed a year-long renovation of the Capitol Records Tower in Hollywood, California.

On July 24, 2014, Capitol's Sam Smith made U.S. pop music history when his debut album In the Lonely Hour sold more copies in its first week of release – 166,000 – than any other debut album by a UK male artist in the 23-year history of Soundscan. The album entered the Billboard Top 200 Albums chart at #2.

Capitol Recording artists 5 Seconds Of Summer became the first Australian artists to enter the Billboard Top 200 Albums chart at #1 with its first full-length album on July 30, 2014. The band's self-titled debut album sold 259,000 copies in its first week of release, achieving the third largest weekly sales tally of the year, to date.

On December 5, 2014, Capitol Music Group artists and recordings received 44 Grammy nominations for 2015, including multiple nominations for Sam Smith (6 nominations including Album Of The Year for In the Lonely Hour and Record Of The Year and Song Of The Year for "Stay with Me"), Beck (4 nominations, including Album Of The Year and Best Rock Album for Morning Phase), Ryan Adams (3 nominations, including Best Rock Album for 2014's Ryan Adams), Rosanne Cash (3 nominations, including Best Americana Album for The River & the Thread), Robert Glasper Experiment (2 nominations including Best R&B Album for Black Radio 2) and Katy Perry (2 nominations, including Best Pop Vocal Album for Prism).

=== 2015 - 2016 ===
On January 9, 2015, Billboard Magazine announced that Capitol Music Group ranked #2 in Industry Market Share plus TEA for the 2014 calendar (7.91%), as tracked by Nielsen SoundScan. It marked the company's highest such ranking in decades, and highlighted CMG's successful turnaround over the previous 24 months since the company was purchased by Universal Music Group in 2012 as part of its acquisition of EMI. In 2012, Nielsen Soundscan ranked CMG at #5 with 6.61%, and the company's leap to #2 quantified a growth in market share of 20%.

On February 8, 2015, Capitol Music Group artists won 12 Grammy Awards, marking the first time in Grammy history that one label swept the big four categories: Album Of The Year (for Beck's Morning Phase) and Record Of The Year (Sam Smith's "Stay With Me"), Song Of The Year ("Stay With Me") and Best New Artist (Sam Smith). Beck also received a Grammy for Best Rock Album (Morning Phase), while Sam Smith won his fourth Grammy in the category of Best Pop Vocal Album (In The Lonely Hour). Blue Note recording artist Rosanne Cash won Best Americana Album for The River & the Thread, plus Best American Roots Performance and Best American Roots Song for "A Feather's Not A Bird." Additional CMG artists to win Grammys included Robert Glasper, who was awarded a statue for Best Traditional R&B Performance for "Jesus Children" from his Black Radio 2 album, and Smokie Norful, who won Best Gospel Performance for "No Greater Love." The 57th Annual Grammy Awards telecast featured performances by numerous CMG artists, including Beck, Annie Lennox, Katy Perry and Sam Smith.

On August 16, 2016, Barnett announced that Paul McCartney had signed a worldwide recording agreement with Capitol Records and that the deal encompassed the artist's entire body of post-Beatles work, as well as new recordings. McCartney is currently working on a new studio album, and working with Capitol on a comprehensive plan for his back catalogue.

On November 1, 2016, Barnett announced a slate of activities related to Capitol Records' 75th Anniversary celebration beginning on November 15 and continuing through 2017. Events include a star on the Hollywood Walk of Fame, the proclamation of November 15 as Capitol Records Day in the city of Los Angeles, and release of a 75-album vinyl collection of historic recordings.

In December 2016, TASCHEN published 75 Years Of Capitol Records, an official account of Capitol Records, from its founding year of 1942 through the present day. With a foreword by Beck, essays by cultural historians and music and architecture critics, as well as hundreds of images from Capitol's extensive archives, the book follows the label's evolution and the making of some of the greatest music of the 20th and 21st centuries. Through pop, rock, country, classical, soul, and jazz, the photographic and musical history includes the label's "most successful, cool, hip, and creative stars, as well as the one-hit wonders who had their all-too-brief moments in the spotlight."

Barnett was interviewed extensively by Tim Ingham of Music Business Worldwide in December 6, 2016 article, during which they discussed Barnett's tenure at Capitol Music Group and the company's November 15, 2016 gala event celebrating its 75th anniversary. At that event, Capitol welcomed chart heavyweights past and present into its Studios A & B, including Katy Perry, Ryan Adams, Halsey, Neil Diamond, Bob Seger, Beck, Niall Horan and Tori Kelly – plus business players from Capitol's halcyon days such as Bhaskar Menon, Joe Smith and Rupert Perry. As Ingham wrote about Barnett, four years into his tenure, he is deeply serious about returning Capitol to its former glories. “From the outset of this journey, we’ve always been very respectful of the past, but it’s really the future we’re excited about,” he told MBW. “For us to get to where we want to get to, we’ve still got a lot to achieve.”

=== 2017 - 2018 ===
On February 10, 2018, as hip-hop trio Migos celebrated their second No. 1 on the Billboard 200 albums chart, with their Quality Control Music/Motown/Capitol release Culture II debuting with 199,000 equivalent album units, according to Nielsen Music, they also made Billboard chart history: The trio tied The Beatles for the most simultaneous entries on the Billboard Hot 100 songs chart among groups, with 14.

On March 24, 2018, rapper Lil Yachty earned his highest-charting effort on the Billboard Top R&B/Hip-Hop Albums chart as his album, Lil Boat 2, opened at No. 2 with 64,000 equivalent album units earned, according to Nielsen Music. The set surpassed his previous chart high, achieved with Teenage Emotions, which peaked at No. 4 last year.

On August 8, 2018, Capitol Music Group held its fifth annual Capitol Congress at the Arclight Theater in Hollywood, highlighted by a daylong session of product presentations, panels, musical performances and a live podcast featuring Paul McCartney and WTF host and GLOW star Marc Maron. Artist showcases included promising Asbury Park singer/songwriter Fletcher (“Undrunk”), Ypsilanti MI and R&B vocalist Queen Naija (“Medicine”). Rapper NF was recognized for more than 3 million adjusted albums sold, including 3.5 billion streams, while Caroline - CMG's independent distribution and label services arm - announced that it had doubled its market share in 12 months to more than 3 percent; and video sizzles touted other new artists including critics’ darling Christine and the Queens and teenpop star Loren Gray.

Other highlights included a 30th anniversary celebration of MC Hammer's 22-million-selling breakthrough album, “Please Hammer, Don’t Hurt Him,” with an interview conducted by UMe VP Urban Catalogue Andre Torres.

An Ethiopia Habtemariam-hosted panel on culture as the new mainstream included Live Nation Urban's Shawn Gee (The Roots, Jill Scott), manager Chase Johnson (A$AP Rocky, Playboy Carti), Capitol Music Group EVP Dion “NoID” Wilson, former Cornerstone and Beats brand market expert Kristen Fraser and Quality Control founder Kevin “Coach K” Lee, the man behind Migos and Lil Yachty, both of whom accepted awards for outstanding sales.

On September 14, 2018, Paul McCartney returned to the top of the music charts for the first time in more than 36 years when his latest album, Egypt Station opened at #1 on the Billboard Top 200 chart. This achievement also marked the first ever debut #1 for McCartney.

On December 6, 2018, Billboard Magazine cited CMG's independent distribution company, Caroline, for more than doubling its U.S. market share to 4 percent, thanks to 15 platinum and nine gold singles. The magazine singled out the success of Michigan rapper NF, whose trifecta of Hot 100 hits in 2018 includes “Let You Down,” which peaked at No. 12. as well as top five debuts on the Billboard 200 from rappers 6ix9ine, Trippie Redd and the late XXXTentacion, who collectively landed 35 entries on the Hot 100.

On December 18, 2018, Lil Baby achieved the highest-charting project of his career with Street Gossip. The Atlanta native's third release of 2018 hit the No. 2 slot on the Billboard 200.

As 2018 drew to a close, Capitol Music Group had earned the highest percentage increase in market share for the entire U.S. music industry that year, with more than 25%.

=== 2019 ===
On January 3, 2019, Amazon Music launched its 2019 Artists to Watch, a playlist featuring a diverse set of up-and-coming artists across numerous genres the tech giant is betting will have a breakout year in 2019. Among the artists poised to break is recently signed Capitol singer/songwriter Freya Ridings.

During the week of January 7, 2019, Capitol Music Group artists held the #1 spots on four separate charts: On the Billboard Hot 100 with Halsey's hit single "Without Me," at Urban Radio with Lil Baby & Gunna's "Drip Too Hard," at AAA Radio with Maggie Rogers' "Light On," and at AC Mainstream with Katy Perry's "Cozy Little Christmas."

On January 15, 2019, it was announced by CBS Television that on February 12, 2019, two days after the 2019 Grammy Awards, the Grammys will tape a salute in Los Angeles to Motown Records, which is celebrating its 60th anniversary this year.

The debut album from Maggie Rogers, Heart It In A Past Life, entered Billboard Magazine's AAA Album Chart at #1 on February 2, 2019, as well as hitting the top spot on the Top Album Sales and #2 on the Billboard 200. It was the highest-charting album on the Billboard 200 by a solo woman in four months.

On August 6, 2019, Caroline artist partner NF debuted in the #1 spot on Billboard Magazine's Top 200 with his fourth album, The Search, and rose to No. 1 on the magazine's Billboard Artist 100 chart and landed three tracks from the album on the Billboard Hot 100.

Barnett hosted what has become one of the music industry's yearly events: CMG's 6th Annual Capitol Congress, on Wednesday, August 7, 2019 at the ArcLight Theatre in Hollywood. During the afternoon gathering, CMG's superstar and developing artists presented forthcoming music and projects to the company's staff, its international affiliates, entertainment industry representatives from around the world and influential consumer and trade media.

During the event, Katy Perry was presented with an RIAA-certified award commemorating 100 million RIAA song certifications. Perry is one of only five artists in history to have topped 100 million certified units with their digital singles, and the first-ever Capitol Records recording artist to join the elite RIAA 100 Million Certified Songs club.

At the same Capitol Congress, Barnett announced that the company and its Caroline arm signed an agreement with K-pop supergroup SuperM through Seoul, Korea-based SM Entertainment Co., Ltd. SuperM's members have been assembled from some of the most popular K-pop acts in the world., and it was revealed during the day's events that SuperM will officially launch in the US in October 2019. CMG/Caroline will provide distribution and will orchestrate marketing, promotion and publicity campaigns in support of SuperM.

Barnett served as Executive Producer for Hitsville: The Making of Motown, the first documentary film on the storied label made with the cooperation of Motown Records founder Berry Gordy. The film chronicles the enormous success and enduring cultural impact of Motown Records, which celebrated its 60th anniversary in September, 2019. Directed by Benjamin and Gabe Turner (Class of 92, I Am Bolt, One Direction: This Is Us), the feature-length documentary, which debuted on Showtime on August 24, 2019, focuses on the period beginning with the birth of the company in Detroit in 1958 until its relocation to Los Angeles in the early 1970s. The film tracks the unique system the company's visionary founder, Berry Gordy, assembled that enabled Motown to become one of the most successful record labels of all time. The creation and initial success of Motown was achieved during a period of significant racial tensions in America and amid the burgeoning Civil Rights Movement. The company's music and post-racial vision were significant factors in helping the U.S.–and the world–evolve through this transformative period in history.

On October 14, 2019, K-pop supergroup Super M became the first group in the genre to launch at #1 on the Billboard Top 200 with its debut release, The 1st Mini Album ‘SuperM’, achieving the biggest-ever debut by a K-pop group in the United States. They also became only the second K-pop act to hit #1 on Billboard's Artist 100 chart.

On October 28, 2019, Lewis Capaldi's breakthrough ballad "Someone You Loved" rose to #1 on the Billboard Hot 100. The track by the 23-year-old Scottish singer-songwriter, released on Vertigo/Capitol Records, previously ruled multiple charts globally, including the Official UK Singles survey, for seven weeks beginning in March.

== Retirement From The Music Industry ==
=== 2020 ===
On November 5, 2020, Barnett announced that he would retire from his position as Chairman & CEO of Capitol Music Group on December 31, 2020, capping a 50-year career in the music business, including eight years at the helm of CMG. In a letter to the CMG staff, Barnett, 68, called the move “a long-planned decision,” one that he made in conjunction with his wife and children “through many hours of discussion and soul-searching.”

In an email to CMG's staff, Universal Music Group Chairman Sir Lucian Grainge wrote, “Today Steve Barnett announced that after an incredible five-decade career in music, capped by nothing less than the revitalization of our iconic Capitol Music Group, he has decided to retire at the end of the year. When Capitol joined our family as part of the EMI acquisition, it was in desperate need of vision, passion and drive. Steve brought all of that and more to the Tower, and today, once again, Capitol stands as a symbol of creative and commercial success in music—a magnet both to great artists and great music business professionals."

The Los Angeles Times marked the occasion of Barnett's retirement by acknowledging his "24-karat ears which helped propel the careers of artists including Beyoncé, Adele, Katy Perry, AC/DC, One Direction and Lil Baby, among dozens of others." The completion of Barnett's tenure at CMG marked the end of a career in which he successfully ran three separate U.S. record companies: CMG, Columbia Records and Epic Records.

Preceded by first	Chairman & Chief Executive Officer of Capitol Music Group; November 2012–2020	Succeeded by incumbent
