= Kent Hartman =

American author

Kent Hartman is a Portland, Oregon-based author. His book The Wrecking Crew: The Inside Story of Rock and Roll's Best-Kept Secret won the Frances Fuller Victor Oregon Book Award in 2013 and was a Los Angeles Times bestseller.

Hartman spent decades in Los Angeles, and worked with a variety of famous recording artists. He produced a nationally syndicated radio program, The Classic Comedy Break. As of 2012 he teaches marketing at Portland State University.

The Wrecking Crew book was inspired by a conversation between the author and Larry Knechtel, a member of the band Bread, and previously a member of the Wrecking Crew, an informal group of studio musicians who played anonymously on many 1960s and 1970s music hits.
