= The Wrecking Crew: The Inside Story of Rock and Roll's Best-Kept Secret =

Book by Kent Hartman

First edition (publ. Thomas Dunne Books)

The Wrecking Crew: The Inside Story of Rock and Roll's Best Kept-Secret is a 2012 book by Kent Hartman about the Wrecking Crew, one of the most successful groups of studio musicians in music history, who played anonymously on many popular recordings in Los Angeles in the 1960s. The book won the Frances Fuller Victor Oregon Book Award in 2013, and it was a Los Angeles Times bestseller. The book was inspired by a conversation between the author and Larry Knechtel, a member of the band Bread, and previously a member of the Wrecking Crew.

The 2013 film 20 Feet from Stardom covered uncredited backup singers in the same era, and has been connected with Hartman's The Wrecking Crew in a review.
