= Wallichs Music City =

Record store in Hollywood, California, USA

Wallichs Music City was a record store in Hollywood, California, US, founded by Glenn E. Wallichs that existed from 1940 to 1978.

== Glenn Wallichs ==
In 1932, Glen Wallichs opened a radio shop in Los Angeles, later opening five other shops in the area. In the mid‐1930s, he started two recording studios. In 1940, Wallichs opened Music City, at Sunset & Vine. In 1946, Wallichs left the business to his brother Clyde. Glenn Wallichs died in 1971, and Wallichs Music City closed in 1978.

== History ==
External images
- Wallich's Music City, at Sunset and Vine, Hollywood 1953, by Sid Avery
- Wallichs Music City with Capitol Records on the 2nd floor, circa 1946
- Eddie Cochran shuffling through albums at the Wallichs Music City

Wallichs Music City was located on the northwest corner of Sunset & Vine and operated from 1940 to 1978. Owner Glenn E. Wallichs, along with Tin Pan Alley songsmith Johnny Mercer and ex-Paramount movie producer Buddy De Sylva, had founded Capitol Records, starting in a small office on Vine Street in 1942 and then moving to larger offices above the store in 1946. After Capitol Records moved to the Capitol Tower in 1956, the offices became the home of Dot Records. Dot Records occupied a smaller second floor area on the Vine Street side of the building leaving the Sunset frontage to be renovated for the updated Wallich's Music City store design including its signature 'googie' architecture. The project launched Kite & Overpeck Architects, Beverly Hills who went on to design the 1962 9000 Sunset Building, a favorite for music agent offices and their clients like Jim Morrison of The Doors.

In an era when most recorded music was sold through mom and pop stores, Wallich's Music City became the premier record store in Southern California and the world's largest specialty record store.

As the market for recorded music evolved during the 1950s and 1960s, it was a source of tickets, sheet music, vinyl (initially 78s, then LP's & 45's) and tapes (8 track and cassette). They also sold TV sets and musical instruments.

It was one of the first music stores to seal record albums in cellophane and put them in display racks for customers to browse. The racks were tabletop height trapezoid-shaped browser boxes (designed by Capitol Records' Frederick Rice) that allowed the covers to be viewed like a card index. The store was also the first to have demonstration booths for listening to records.

The store became a hub of the L.A. music scene. Music fans flocked there to meet artists like Bing Crosby, Judy Garland, Johnny Mercer and Nat King Cole to have them sign sheet music of their latest hits. Frank Zappa worked part-time there in 1965 as a salesman in the singles department. Radio ads featured Wallichs, who would sing the jingle "It's Music City" (to the first notes of "Rock-a-bye Baby", with the following four bars covered by a jazz ensemble), followed by news of specials, upcoming events, etc.

In 1963, the vocal group The Pleasures recorded the song "Music City" as a tribute to the store.

== Bibliography ==
- "Wallichs Maps Plans to Expand Disk Outlets." Billboard, Dec 1, 1956, p. 15
- Leap, Norris. "One Day Wallichs Awoke, Found Himself Millionaire." Los Angeles Times, Jan 5, 1959.
- "Wallichs Buys 3d Disk Outlet in L.A. Area." Billboard, Apr 6, 1959, p. 3
- Alpert, Don. "Stereo." Los Angeles Times, Feb 28, 1960
- "$127 Million in Downtown Projects Okd." Los Angeles Times, June 24, 1960
- "Wallichs Will Mark 30th Anniversary." Los Angeles Times, Dec 11, 1960
- Zhito, Lee. "Wallichs' Music City Lifts Policy; to Cut LP Prices." Billboard, January 30, 1961, p. 2
- "Dealers Air LP Discount Views." Billboard, Mar 13, 1961, p. 18
- Zhito, Lee. "Earphone Doubles Music City Sales." Billboard, November 6, 1961, p. 22
- "Music Firm Will Build In Torrance." Los Angeles Times, Jun 30, 1963
- "Clyde Wallichs Sells Interest in Music City to Other Stockholders." Billboard, March 2, 1963, p. 8
- "6,000 Attend Store Opening." Los Angeles Times, Nov 24, 1963
- "Coast Chain Starts Selling Components." Billboard, December 14, 1963
- "Business Wrap-Up." Billboard, July 4, 1964, p. 35
- Tiegel, Eilot. "Los Angeles Market Booms." Billboard, Oct 17, 1964, p. 40
- "Airway Saturation." Billboard, Oct 17, 1964, p. 40
- "Organ Hobby Lesson Plan Now Available." Los Angeles Times, Apr 4, 1965
- "Music City Buys Chain." Billboard, July 15, 1967, p. 19
- Weber, Bruce. "8th Wallichs is Opened." Billboard, Nov 11, 1967, p. 62
- Turpin, Dick. "New Kind of 'Downtown' in Making." Los Angeles Times, Mar 10, 1968
- Freedland, Nat. "Wallichs' 'New Look' Spurs Music City Chain's Profits." Billboard, December 18, 1971, p. 3
- "Capitol Records Head, Glenn E. Wallichs, Dies." Los Angeles Times, Dec 24, 1971
- Dexter, Dave. "Glenn E. Wallichs—A Fond Farewell." Billboard, January 8, 1972, p. 3
- "Wallichs Music Filed For Protection Under Chapter 11." Los Angeles Times, Mar 9, 1977.
- Sippel, John. "Wallichs Stores File Bankruptcy." Billboard, Mar 19, 1977, p. 10
- Siegel, Barry. "It's Bankruptcy Blues at Music City." Los Angeles Times, March 29, 1977
- Sippel, John. "Investor Quartet Refloats Wallichs." Billboard, May 14, 1977, p. 5
- Tepper, Ron. "The Eyes of the Industry Watch L.A. Retailing." Billboard, November 15, 1980, p. LA-46
- Ryon, Ruth. "Merv Griffin Buys Hollywood Corner." Los Angeles Times, Nov 3, 1983
- Ryon, Ruth. "Developers Gamble on Spring Fever." Los Angeles Times, Oct 12, 1986.
- Grein, Paul. "The Story So Far, From the Beginning." Billboard, Jun 13, 1992, p. 48
- Hoskyns, Barney. Waiting For the Sun – The Story of the Los Angeles Music Scene, Viking, 1996
- "Billboard". Nielsen Business Media, Inc. 15 December 1958. p. 53 – via Internet Archive. "Wallichs."
- "Billboard". Nielsen Business Media, Inc. 13 June 1992 – via Google Books.
- "Billboard". Nielsen Business Media, Inc. 9 January 1961 – via Google Books.
- "Billboard". Nielsen Business Media, Inc. 18 December 1971. p. 66 – via Internet Archive. "Wallichs."
- Bronson, Fred (6 August 1997). "The Billboard Book of Number One Hits". Billboard Books – via Internet Archive. "Wallichs Music City Billboard."
- "Billboard". Nielsen Business Media, Inc. 15 November 1980 – via Google Books.
- "Billboard". Billboard Publications. 1 September 1974 – via Google Books.
- "Billboard". Nielsen Business Media, Inc. 2 March 1963 – via Google Books.
- "Billboard". Nielsen Business Media, Inc. 15 July 1967. p. 19 – via Internet Archive. "q=Wallichs."
- "Billboard". Nielsen Business Media, Inc. 18 December 1971. p. 66 – via Internet Archive. "Wallichs."
- "Billboard". Nielsen Business Media, Inc. 11 November 1967 – via Google Books.
