= Conejo Valley Unified School District =

School district in Ventura County, California

Address
- 1400 East Janss Road Thousand Oaks, California, 91362; United States

District information
- Type: Public
- Grades: K–12
- Superintendent: Mark W. McLaughlin, Ed.D.
- NCES District ID: 0609640

Students and staff
- Students: 17,397 (2020–2021) 16,703 (2022–2023)
- Teachers: 798.26 (FTE)
- Staff: 733.49 (FTE)
- Student–teacher ratio: 21.79:1

Other information
- Website: www.conejousd.org

The Conejo Valley Unified School District (CVUSD) is a school district in Ventura County, California. The district serves the Conejo Valley area, including the city of Thousand Oaks, and its neighborhood of Newbury Park, as well as the census-designated places of Casa Conejo and Lake Sherwood. It also includes Ventu Park.

== History ==
The older CVUSD logo

The Conejo Valley Unified School District was established in 1974 from the merger of three school districts covering the Conejo Valley, including two elementary districts and the eastern portion of the Oxnard Union High School District (OUHSD). Thousand Oaks and Newbury Park high schools predate unification, having been built by OUHSD in the 1960s.

== Schools ==
CVUSD has the following schools.

=== Preschools ===
- CVUSD Preschool
- Horizon Hills
- Wonder Preschool

=== Elementary schools ===
- Acacia Magnet School
- Aspen Elementary School
- Banyan Elementary School
- Conejo Academy
- Conejo Elementary School
- Cypress Elementary School
- EARThS Magnet School
- Glenwood Elementary School
- Ladera STARS Academy
- Lang Ranch Elementary School
- Madroña Elementary School
- Maple Elementary School
- Sycamore Canyon Elementary School
- Walnut Elementary School
- Weathersfield Elementary School
- Westlake Elementary School
- Westlake Hills Elementary School
- Wildwood Elementary School

=== Middle schools ===
- Colina Middle School
- Los Cerritos Middle School
- Redwood Middle School
- Sequoia Middle School
- Century Academy
- Sycamore Canyon Middle School

=== High schools ===
- Newbury Park High School
- Thousand Oaks High School
- Westlake High School
- Conejo Valley High School
- Century Academy

=== Adult schools ===
- Conejo Valley Adult Education

==== Los Cerritos Middle School ====
Los Cerritos Middle School (LCMS) was named a Blue Ribbon School in 2004.

In 2010, the Los Cerritos Middle School Jazz Band became the first Ventura County school band to perform at the Midwest Band Clinic, an international band and orchestra conference that is held annually in Chicago. According to school representatives, the invitation is the highest honor a school band can receive.

In 2026, Los Cerritos Middle School was named a California Distinguished School for Exceptional Student Performance as one of the highest performing middle and high schools in the state. It was one of only two middle and high schools in the Conejo Valley to receive the honor.

==== Sequoia Middle School ====
Sequoia Middle School was named a California Distinguished School in 2011, the only Ventura County school to be so honored that year. Sequoia is also an International Baccalaureate (IB) Candidate School.

== School board ==
=== Board members ===
The Conejo Valley Unified School District School Board consists of five trustees from five districted areas within Conejo Valley and one student board trustee.

- Lisa Evans Powell, DSW-President
- Karen Sylvester-Vice President
- Bill Gorback-Clerk
- Lauren Gill
- Cindy Goldberg
- Finn Kerns-Student Trustee
