= NF discography =

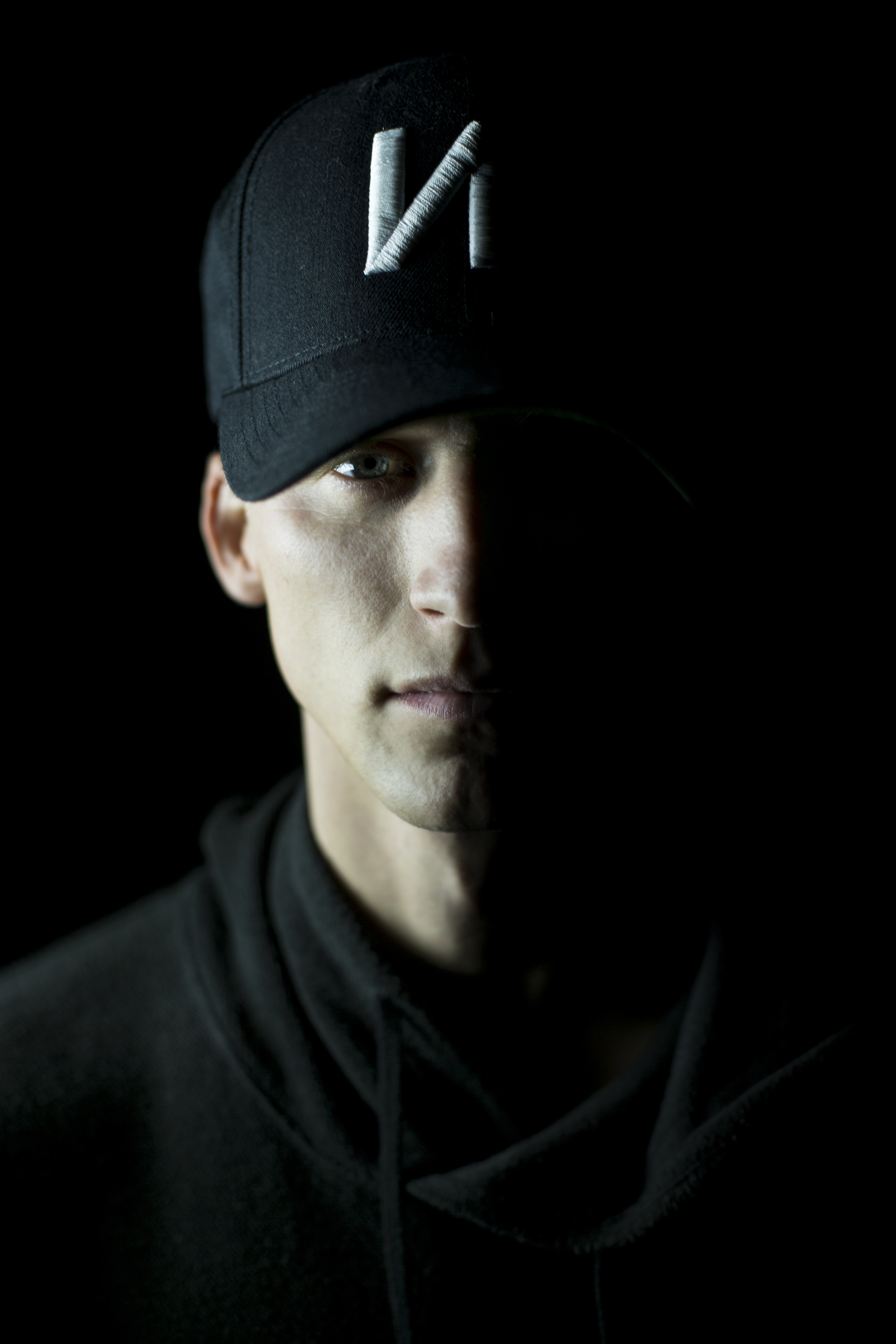
- NF in 2016
- Studio albums: 6
- EPs: 3
- Singles: 25
- Mixtapes: 1

American rapper NF has released five studio albums and three EPs. His first major-label album, Mansion, was released on March 31, 2015. His second studio album, Therapy Session, was released on April 22, 2016, and peaked at number 12 on the US Billboard 200.

NF achieved mainstream popularity in 2017 with Perception; the album charted at number one in the United States and was certified platinum, while its third single, "Let You Down", reached number twelve on the US Billboard Hot 100, and was a top-ten hit internationally. He achieved similar commercial success with his follow up The Search (2019). He released the mixtape Clouds in 2021, which peaked at number 3 on the US Billboard 200 chart.

Feuerstein's album, Hope, released on April 7, 2023, had commercial success and peaked at number 2 on the US Billboard 200. An extended play, Fear (2025), peaked at number 4 on the chart.

== Studio albums ==
List of studio albums, with selected chart positions and certifications
| Title | Album details | Peak chart positions | | | | | | | | | | Certifications |
| Title | Album details | US | AUS | CAN | DEN | IRE | NLD | NOR | NZ | SWE | UK | Certifications |
|---|---|---|---|---|---|---|---|---|---|---|---|---|
| Moments (as Nathan Feuerstein) | Released: November 29, 2010; Label: Self-released; Format: CD, digital download | — | — | — | — | — | — | — | — | — | — | |
| Mansion | Released: March 31, 2015; Label: Capitol CMG; Format: CD, digital download | 62 | — | — | — | — | — | — | — | — | — | RIAA: Gold; MC: Gold |
| Therapy Session | Released: April 22, 2016; Label: Capitol CMG; Format: CD, LP, digital download | 12 | — | 43 | — | — | — | — | — | — | — | RIAA: Platinum; BPI: Silver; MC: Gold |
| Perception | Released: October 6, 2017; Label: NF Real Music/Capitol/Caroline; Format: CD, LP, digital download | 1 | 73 | 14 | 8 | — | 57 | 10 | — | 22 | — (Note: Perception did not enter the UK Albums Chart, but peaked at number 57 on the UK Album Downloads Chart.) | RIAA: 2× Platinum; ARIA: Gold; BPI: Gold; GLF: 2× Platinum; IFPI DEN: 2× Platinum; MC: 2× Platinum; RMNZ: 2× Platinum |
| The Search | Released: July 26, 2019; Label: NF Real Music/Caroline; Formats: CD, LP, digital download, streaming | 1 | 3 | 4 | 10 | 8 | 6 | 11 | 3 | 35 | 7 | RIAA: Platinum; ARIA: Gold; BPI: Platinum; GLF: Gold; IFPI DEN: Platinum; MC: Platinum; RMNZ: Platinum |
| Hope | Released: April 7, 2023; Label: NF Real Music/Caroline; Formats: CD, LP, digital download, streaming | 2 | 2 | 2 | 10 | 16 | 1 | 2 | 1 | 15 | 2 | RIAA: Gold; BPI: Silver; RMNZ: Gold |
"—" denotes releases that did not chart or were not released in that territory.

== Mixtapes ==
List of mixtapes, with selected chart positions and certifications
| Title | Album details | Peak chart positions | | | | | | | | | | Certifications |
| Title | Album details | US | AUS | CAN | DEN | FIN | IRE | NZ | NOR | SWE | UK | Certifications |
|---|---|---|---|---|---|---|---|---|---|---|---|---|
| Clouds | Released: March 26, 2021; Label: NF Real Music/Caroline; Format: CD, LP, digital download, streaming | 3 | 5 | 6 | 35 | 16 | 21 | 11 | 23 | 27 | 12 | RIAA: Gold; BPI: Silver; MC: Gold |

== Extended plays ==
List of EPs, with selected chart positions
| Title | EP details | Peak chart positions | | | | | | | | | |
| Title | EP details | US | US R&B/HH | CAN | DEN | IRE | NZ | NOR | SWE | SWI | UK |
|---|---|---|---|---|---|---|---|---|---|---|---|
| I'm Free | Released: May 1, 2012; Label: Xist; Format: CD, digital download | — | — | — | — | — | — | — | — | — | — |
| NF | Released: August 5, 2014; Label: Capitol CMG; Format: CD, digital download | — (Note: NF did not enter the Billboard 200, but peaked at number 12 on the Top Christian Albums chart.) | — (Note: NF did not enter the Top R&B/Hip-Hop Albums, but peaked at number 15 on the Top Rap Albums chart.) | — | — | — | — | — | — | — | — (Note: NF did not enter the UK Albums Chart, but peaked at number 9 on the Official Christian & Gospel Albums Chart.) |
| Fear | Release: November 14, 2025; Label: NF Real Music; Format: CD, LP, digital download, streaming | 4 | 2 | 9 | 36 | 36 | 14 | 27 | 31 | 2 | 14 |
"—" denotes releases that did not chart or were not released in that territory.

== Singles ==
=== As lead artist ===
List of singles, with selected chart positions and certifications, showing year released and album name
| Title | Year | Peak chart positions | | | | | | | | | | Certifications | Album |
| Title | Year | US | US R&B /HH | US Christ. | AUS | CAN | IRE | NOR | NZ | SWE | UK | Certifications | Album |
|---|---|---|---|---|---|---|---|---|---|---|---|---|---|
| "Alone" (with Tommee Profitt and Brooke Griffith) | 2011 | — | — | — | — | — | — | — | — | — | — | | Non-album singles |
| "Beautiful Addiction" (with Brady Schmitz, Tommee Profitt and Danielle Swift) | 2013 | — | — | — | — | — | — | — | — | — | — | | Non-album singles |
| "Intro" | 2015 | — | — | 26 | — | — | — | — | — | — | — | | Mansion |
| "Wait" | 2015 | — | — | 28 | — | — | — | — | — | — | — | | Mansion |
| "All I Have" | 2015 | — | — | 39 | — | — | — | — | — | — | — | RIAA: Gold | Mansion |
| "Intro 2" | 2016 | — | — | 17 | — | — | — | — | — | — | — | | Therapy Session |
| "I Just Wanna Know" | 2016 | — | — | 15 | — | — | — | — | — | — | — | | Therapy Session |
| "Real" | 2016 | — | — | 16 | — | — | — | — | — | — | — | RIAA: Platinum; MC: Gold | Therapy Session |
| "Warm Up" | 2016 | — | — | 13 | — | — | — | — | — | — | — | RIAA: Gold | Non-album single |
| "Outro" | 2017 | — | — | 14 | — | — | — | — | — | — | — | | Perception |
| "Green Lights" | 2017 | — | — (Note: "Green Lights" did not enter the Billboard Hot R&B/Hip-Hop Songs chart, but peaked at No. 25 on the R&B/Hip-Hop Digital Song Sales chart.) | 11 | — | — | — | — | — | — | — | RIAA: Gold; MC: Gold | Perception |
| "Let You Down" | 2017 | 12 | 6 | 1 | 7 | 15 | 4 | 2 | 7 | 2 | 6 | RIAA: 8× Platinum; ARIA: 10× Platinum; BPI: 3× Platinum; GLF: 4× Platinum; MC: 9× Platinum; RMNZ: 5× Platinum | Perception |
| "No Name" | 2018 | 82 | 35 | — (Note: "No Name" did not enter the Billboard Hot Christian Songs chart, but peaked at No. 28 on the Billboard Christian Hot AC/CHR chart.) | — | — | — | — | — | — | — | RIAA: Gold; ARIA: Gold | Non-album single |
| "Lie" | 2018 | 48 | 19 | — | — | — (Note: "Lie" did not enter the Billboard Canadian Hot 100 chart, but peaked at No. 38 on the Canada CHR/Top 40 chart.) | — | — | — | — | — | RIAA: 3× Platinum; ARIA: 3× Platinum; BPI: Gold; MC: 3× Platinum; RMNZ: Platinum | Perception |
| "Why" | 2018 | — (Note: "Why" did not enter the Billboard Hot 100, but peaked at No. 16 on the Bubbling Under Hot 100 Singles chart.) | — (Note: "Why" did not enter the Billboard Hot R&B/Hip-Hop Songs chart, but peaked at No. 9 on the Bubbling Under R&B/Hip-Hop Singles chart.) | — | — | — | — | — | — | — | — | RIAA: Platinum; ARIA: Platinum; MC: Platinum; RMNZ: Gold | The Search |
| "If You Want Love" | 2019 | — (Note: "If You Want Love" did not enter the Billboard Hot 100, but peaked at No. 39 on the Mainstream Top 40 chart.) | — | — (Note: "If You Want Love" did not enter the Billboard Hot Christian Songs chart, but peaked at No. 23 on the Christian Hot AC/CHR chart.) | — | — | — | — | — | — | — | RIAA: 3× Platinum; ARIA: 2× Platinum; BPI: Silver; MC: 3× Platinum; RMNZ: Platinum | Perception |
| "The Search" | 2019 | 70 | 27 | — (Note: "The Search" did not enter the Billboard Hot Christian Songs chart, but peaked at No. 29 on the Christian Hot AC/CHR chart.) | — | 59 | 69 | — | — (Note: "The Search" did not enter the NZ Top 40 Singles Chart, but peaked at No. 12 on the NZ Hot Singles Chart.) | — | 88 | RIAA: 2× Platinum; ARIA: 3× Platinum; BPI: Platinum; MC: 3× Platinum; RMNZ: Platinum | The Search |
| "When I Grow Up" | 2019 | 78 | 28 | — | — | 55 | 63 | — | — (Note: "The Search" did not enter the NZ Top 40 Singles Chart, but peaked at No. 10 on the NZ Hot Singles Chart.) | — | 98 | RIAA: 2× Platinum; ARIA: Platinum; BPI: Silver; MC: Platinum; RMNZ: Gold | The Search |
| "Time" | 2019 | 41 | 19 | — | 38 | 70 | 66 | — | — (Note: "Time" did not enter the NZ Top 40 Singles Chart, but peaked at No. 12 on the NZ Hot Singles Chart.) | — | 76 | RIAA: 2× Platinum; ARIA: 3× Platinum; BPI: Silver; MC: 2× Platinum; RMNZ: Platinum | The Search |
| "Paid My Dues" | 2019 | — (Note: "Paid My Dues" did not enter the Billboard Hot 100, but peaked at No. 6 on the Bubbling Under Hot 100 Singles chart.) | — (Note: "Paid My Dues" did not enter the Billboard Hot R&B/Hip-Hop Songs chart, but peaked at No. 1 on the Bubbling Under R&B/Hip-Hop Singles chart.) | — | — | — | — | — | — (Note: "Paid My Dues" did not enter the NZ Top 40 Singles Chart, but peaked at number 30 on the NZ Hot Singles Chart.) | — | — | RIAA: Gold; ARIA: Gold; MC: Gold | Clouds (The Mixtape) |
| "Chasing_(Demo)" (featuring Mikayla Sippel) | 2020 | — | — | — | — | — | — | — | — (Note: "Chasing_(Demo)" did not enter the NZ Top 40 Singles Chart, but peaked at number 16 on the NZ Hot Singles Chart.) | — | — | | Non-album single |
| "Clouds" | 2021 | 53 | 22 | — | — | 52 | 58 | — | — (Note: "Clouds" did not enter the NZ Top 40 Singles Chart, but peaked at number six on the NZ Hot Singles Chart.) | — | 56 | RIAA: Platinum; ARIA: Gold; MC: Platinum | Clouds (The Mixtape) |
| "Lost" (featuring Hopsin) | 2021 | 79 | 33 | — | — | 61 | 85 | — | — (Note: "Lost" did not enter the NZ Top 40 Singles Chart, but peaked at number 15 on the NZ Hot Singles Chart.) | — | 88 | RIAA: Gold; MC: Gold | Clouds (The Mixtape) |
| "Hope" | 2023 | 49 | 16 | — | — | 40 | 49 | — | — (Note: "Hope" did not enter the NZ Top 40 Singles Chart, but peaked at number seven on the NZ Hot Singles Chart.) | — | 48 | RIAA: Gold; ARIA: Gold; MC: Gold; RMNZ: Gold | Hope |
| "Motto" | 2023 | — (Note: "Motto" did not enter the Billboard Hot 100, but peaked at No. 2 on the Bubbling Under Hot 100 Singles chart.) | 29 | — | — | 83 | 89 | — | — (Note: "Motto" did not enter the NZ Top 40 Singles Chart, but peaked at number 12 on the NZ Hot Singles Chart.) | — | 73 | | Hope |
| "Happy" | 2023 | 54 | — | — | — | 45 | 65 | — | — (Note: "Happy" did not enter the NZ Top 40 Singles Chart, but peaked at number four on the NZ Hot Singles Chart.) | — (Note: "Happy" did not enter the Swedish Singellista Chart, but peaked at number 19 on the Swedish Heatseeker Chart.) | 51 | RIAA: Gold; ARIA: Gold; RMNZ: Gold; BPI: Silver | Hope |
"—" denotes releases that did not chart or were not released in that territory.

=== As featured artist ===
List of singles, with selected chart positions, showing year released and album name
| Title | Year | Peak positions | Certifications | Album |
| Title | Year | US Christ. | Certifications | Album |
|---|---|---|---|---|
| "Start Over" (Flame featuring NF) | 2013 | — | | Royal Flush |
| "Till the Day I Die" (TobyMac featuring NF) | 2015 | 29 | RIAA: Gold | This Is Not a Test |
| "The One with My Friends" (Marty featuring NF, John Givez, Wordsplayed, Kaleb Mitchell and Fern) | 2015 | — | | Marty for President (EP) |
| "Epiphany" (Futuristic featuring NF) | 2017 | — | | Blessings |
"—" denotes releases that did not chart or were not released in that territory.

== Promotional singles ==
List of songs, with selected chart positions and certifications, showing year released and album name
| Title | Year | Peak chart positions | | | | | | Album |
| Title | Year | US | US R&B /HH | CAN | NZ Hot | UK | WW | Album |
|---|---|---|---|---|---|---|---|---|
| "Who I Was" (featuring Machine Gun Kelly) | 2025 | 62 | 13 | 57 | 5 | 76 | 151 | Fear |
| "Sorry" (with James Arthur) | 2025 | 70 | — | 72 | 6 | 73 | 192 | Fear |

== Other charted or certified songs ==
List of songs, with selected chart positions and certifications, showing year released and album name
| Title | Year | Peak chart positions | | | | | | | | | Certifications | Album |
| Title | Year | US | US R&B /HH | US Christ. | US Christ Digital | CAN | IRE | NZ Hot | UK | WW | Certifications | Album |
|---|---|---|---|---|---|---|---|---|---|---|---|---|
| "Mansion" (featuring Fleurie) | 2015 | — | — | 30 | 44 | — | — | — | — | — | RIAA: Platinum; ARIA: Gold; MC: Gold | Mansion |
| "Wake Up" | 2015 | — | — | 49 | 40 | — | — | — | — | — | RIAA: Gold | Mansion |
| "Notepad" | 2015 | — | — | 44 | — | — | — | — | — | — | | Mansion |
| "Paralyzed" | 2015 | — | — | — | — | — | — | — | — | — | RIAA: Platinum; ARIA: Platinum; BPI: Silver; MC: Platinum; RMNZ: Gold | Mansion |
| "I'll Keep On" (featuring Jeremiah Carlson of The Neverclaim) | 2015 | — | — | 19 | 14 | — | — | — | — | — | | Mansion |
| "Can You Hold Me" (featuring Britt Nicole) | 2015 | — | — | 34 | — | — | — | — | — | — | RIAA: Gold | Mansion |
| "Therapy Session" | 2016 | — | — | 19 | 14 | — | — | — | — | — | RIAA: Platinum; ARIA: Gold; MC: Gold | Therapy Session |
| "How Could You Leave Us" | 2016 | — | — | 23 | 11 | — | — | — | — | — | RIAA: Platinum; ARIA: Platinum; MC: Platinum; RMNZ: Gold | Therapy Session |
| "Breathe" | 2016 | — | — | 36 | — | — | — | — | — | — | | Therapy Session |
| "Oh Lord" | 2016 | — | — | 20 | 14 | — | — | — | — | — | RIAA: Gold; MC: Gold | Therapy Session |
| "I Can Feel It" | 2016 | — | — | 43 | — | — | — | — | — | — | | Therapy Session |
| "Got You on My Mind" | 2016 | — | — | 29 | 31 | — | — | — | — | — | RIAA: Platinum; MC: Gold | Therapy Session |
| "Grindin'" (featuring Marty of Social Club) | 2016 | — | — | 19 | 46 | — | — | — | — | — | RIAA: Gold; MC: Gold | Therapy Session |
| "Wish You Wouldn't" | 2016 | — | — | 44 | — | — | — | — | — | — | | Therapy Session |
| "Statement" | 2016 | — | — | 38 | — | — | — | — | — | — | | Therapy Session |
| "All I Do" | 2016 | — | — | 39 | — | — | — | — | — | — | | Therapy Session |
| "Lost in the Moment" (featuring Jonathan Thulin) | 2016 | — | — | 33 | 38 | — | — | — | — | — | RIAA: Gold; ARIA: Gold; MC: Gold | Therapy Session |
| "Intro III" | 2017 | — | — | — | — | — | — | — | — | — | RIAA: Gold; ARIA: Gold; MC: Gold | Perception |
| "Outcast" | 2017 | — | — | — | — (Note: "Outcast" did not enter the Billboard Christian Digital Song Sales chart, but peaked at No. 18 on the Rap Digital Song Sales chart.) | — | — | — | — | — | RIAA: Gold; MC: Gold | Perception |
| "10 Feet Down" (featuring Ruelle) | 2017 | — | — | — | — | — | — | — | — | — | RIAA: Gold; MC: Gold | Perception |
| "Dreams" | 2017 | — | — | — | — | — | — | — | — | — | RIAA: Gold; MC: Gold | Perception |
| "My Life" | 2017 | — | — | — | — | — | — | — | — | — | RIAA: Gold; ARIA: Gold; MC: Gold | Perception |
| "You're Special" | 2017 | — | — | — | — | — | — | — | — | — | RIAA: Gold | Perception |
| "Remember This" | 2017 | — | — | — | — | — | — | — | — | — | RIAA: Platinum; ARIA: Gold; MC: Gold | Perception |
| "Leave Me Alone" | 2019 | 85 | 33 | — (Note: "Leave Me Alone" did not enter the Billboard Hot Christian Songs chart, but peaked at No. 33 on the Hot R&B/Hip-Hop Songs chart.) | — (Note: "Leave Me Alone" did not enter the Billboard Christian Digital Song Sales chart, but peaked at No. 15 on the R&B/Hip-Hop Digital Song Sales chart.) | 68 | 94 | 12 | — | — | RIAA: Platinum; ARIA: Gold; MC: Platinum | The Search |
| "Change" | 2019 | — | — | — | — | — | — | 23 | — | — | RIAA: Gold; ARIA: Gold; MC: Gold | The Search |
| "My Stress" | 2019 | — | — | — | — | — | — | — | — | — | RIAA: Platinum; ARIA: Gold; MC: Gold | The Search |
| "Nate" | 2019 | — | — | — | — | — | — | — | — | — | RIAA: Gold | The Search |
| "Returns" | 2019 | — | — | — | — | — | — | — | — | — | RIAA: Gold | The Search |
| "Only" (with Sasha Sloan) | 2019 | — | — | — | — | — | — | 26 | — | — | RIAA: Gold; ARIA: Gold; MC: Gold | The Search |
| "Hate Myself" | 2019 | — | — | — | — | — | — | — | — | — | RIAA: Gold; ARIA: Platinum; MC: Gold; RMNZ: Gold | The Search |
| "I Miss the Days" | 2019 | — | — | — | — | — | — | — | — | — | RIAA: Gold; ARIA: Gold; MC: Gold | The Search |
| "Trauma" | 2019 | — | — | — | — | — | — | — | — | — | MC: Gold | The Search |
| "That's a Joke" | 2021 | — | — | — | — | — | — | 29 | — | — | | Clouds (The Mixtape) |
| "Just Like You" | 2021 | — (Note: "Just Like You" did not enter the Billboard Hot 100, but peaked at No. 13 on the Bubbling Under Hot 100 chart, and at No. 30 on the Mainstream Top 40.) | — | — | — | 81 | — | 8 | — | — | RIAA: Gold; ARIA: Gold; MC: Gold | Clouds (The Mixtape) |
| "Drifting" | 2021 | — | — | — | — | — | — | 21 | — | — | | Clouds (The Mixtape) |
| "Trust" (featuring Tech N9ne) | 2021 | — (Note: "Trust" did not enter the Billboard Hot 100, but peaked at No. 17 on the Bubbling Under Hot 100 chart.) | — | — | — | — | — | 24 | — | — | | Clouds (The Mixtape) |
| "Careful" (featuring Cordae) | 2023 | 85 | 29 | — | — | 82 | — | 10 | — | — | | Hope |
| "Mama" | 2023 | — (Note: "Mama" did not enter the Billboard Hot 100, but peaked at No. 23 on the Bubbling Under Hot 100 Singles chart.) | 46 | — | — | — | — | — | — | — | | Hope |
| "Pandemonium" | 2023 | — (Note: "Pandemonium" did not enter the Billboard Hot 100, but peaked at No. 12 on the Bubbling Under Hot 100 Singles chart.) | 41 | — | — | — | — | — | — | — | | Hope |
| "Suffice" | 2023 | — (Note: "Suffice" did not enter the Billboard Hot 100, but peaked at No. 25 on the Bubbling Under Hot 100 Singles chart.) | 47 | — | — | — | — | — | — | — | | Hope |
| "Gone" (featuring Julia Michaels) | 2023 | — (Note: "Gone" did not enter the Billboard Hot 100, but peaked at No. 13 on the Bubbling Under Hot 100 Singles chart.) | — | — | — | — | — | 11 | — | — | | Hope |
| "Bullet" | 2023 | — | 48 | — | — | — | — | — | — | — | | Hope |
| "Running" | 2023 | — | — | — | — | — | — | 17 | — | — | ARIA: Gold | Hope |
| "Fear" | 2025 | 35 | 9 | — | — | 47 | 87 | 1 | 53 | 62 | | Fear |
| "Home" | 2025 | 86 | — | — | — | 82 | — | 7 | — | — | | Fear |
| "Give Me a Reason" | 2025 | 85 | 21 | — | — | 88 | — | — | — | — | | Fear |
| "Washed Up" | 2025 | — (Note: "Washed Up" did not enter the Billboard Hot 100, but peaked at No. 9 on the Bubbling Under Hot 100 Singles chart.) | 32 | — | — | — | — | — | — | — | | Fear |
"—" denotes releases that did not chart or were not released in that territory.

== Music videos ==
List of music videos, showing year released and directors
| Title | Year | Director(s) | Reference |
|---|---|---|---|
| "All I Have" | 2014 | | |
| "Wake Up" | 2015 | Jon Jon Augustavo | |
| "Intro" | 2015 | | |
| "Notepad" | 2015 | | |
| "Wait" | 2015 | | |
| "Intro 2" | 2016 | | |
| "I Just Wanna Know" | 2016 | Patrick Tohill | |
| "Real" | 2016 | Patrick Tohill | |
| "Grindin' (featuring Marty)" | 2016 | | |
| "Therapy Session" | 2016 | Patrick Tohill | |
| "Warm Up" | 2016 | Patrick Tohill | |
| "How Could You Leave Us" | 2017 | Patrick Tohill | |
| "Outro" | 2017 | Patrick Tohill | |
| "Green Lights" | 2017 | Patrick Tohill & Nathan Feuerstein | |
| "Outcast" | 2017 | Patrick Tohill & Nathan Feuerstein | |
| "Let You Down" | 2017 | Patrick Tohill & Nathan Feuerstein | |
| "No Name" | 2018 | Patrick Tohill & Nathan Feuerstein | |
| "Why" | 2018 | Patrick Tohill & Nathan Feuerstein | |
| "If You Want Love" | 2018 | Patrick Tohill & Nathan Feuerstein | |
| "The Search" | 2019 | Patrick Tohill & Nathan Feuerstein | |
| "When I Grow Up" | 2019 | Patrick Tohill & Nathan Feuerstein | |
| "Time" | 2019 | Patrick Tohill & Nathan Feuerstein | |
| "Leave Me Alone" | 2019 | Patrick Tohill & Nathan Feuerstein | |
| "Paid My Dues" | 2019 | Patrick Tohill & Nathan Feuerstein | |
| "Clouds" | 2021 | Patrick Tohill & Nathan Feuerstein | |
| "Lost (featuring Hopsin)" | 2021 | Patrick Tohill & Nathan Feuerstein | |
| "Story" | 2021 | Patrick Tohill & Nathan Feuerstein | |
| "Hope" | 2023 | Patrick Tohill & Nathan Feuerstein | |
| "Motto" | 2023 | Patrick Tohill & Nathan Feuerstein | |
| "Happy" | 2023 | Patrick Tohill & Nathan Feuerstein | |
| "Fear" | 2025 | Andrew Donoho | |
| "Washed Up" | 2025 | Jensen Noen | |
