= Lie (NF song) =

Single by NF

from the album Perception
- Released: April 17, 2018
- Recorded: 2017
- Studio: Tomme Profitt, Grand Rapids, Michigan; Franklin, Tennessee
- Genre: Hip hop; R&B
- Length: 3:29
- Label: Capitol; Caroline; NF Real Music
- Songwriters: Feuerstein; Profitt; Mike Elizondo, Jr.
- Producer: Tommee Profitt

NF singles chronology
"No Name" (2018)	"Lie" (2018)	"Why" (2018)

"Lie" is a song by American rapper NF. It serves as the fourth single from his third studio album, Perception (2017), and was released on April 17, 2018, for digital download and streaming. It was written by NF alongside Mike Elizondo, Jr. and producer Tommee Profitt.

== Background ==
"Lie" was released on April 17, 2018, as the fourth single for his third studio album, Perception. The song is NF's second mainstream radio release, following "Let You Down". On the track, NF tells the story of a failed relationship and calls out a girl for being "cold" to him and lying about how bad he was to her. "Lie" peaked at No. 48 on the Billboard Hot 100. Its highest peak on any chart was the US Mainstream Top 40, where it reached No. 8.

== Credits and personnel ==
Personnel

- Nathan Feurstein – songwriter
- Tommee Profitt – songwriter, producer, mixing, instruments, programming
- Mike Elizondo, Jr. – songwriter

Credits adapted from Genius.

Recording

- Tomme Profitt Studios, Grand Rapids, Michigan
- Tomme Profitt Studios, Franklin, Tennessee.

== Charts ==
=== Weekly charts ===
Chart (2018–2019)	Peak position
Czech Republic Airplay (ČNS IFPI)	15
US Billboard Hot 100	48
US Hot R&B/Hip-Hop Songs (Billboard)	19
US Pop Airplay (Billboard)	8
US Rhythmic Airplay (Billboard)	25

=== Year-end charts ===
Chart (2018)	Position
US Hot R&B/Hip-Hop Songs (Billboard)	78
US Mainstream Top 40 (Billboard)	39

== Certifications ==
Region	Certification	Certified units/sales
Australia (ARIA)	3× Platinum	210,000^{‡}
Canada (Music Canada)	3× Platinum	240,000^{‡}
Denmark (IFPI Danmark)	Gold	45,000^{‡}
New Zealand (RMNZ)	Platinum	30,000^{‡}
Portugal (AFP)	Gold	5,000^{‡}
United Kingdom (BPI)	Gold	400,000^{‡}
United States (RIAA)	3× Platinum	3,000,000^{‡}
^{‡} Sales+streaming figures based on certification alone.
