= If You Want Love =

Single by NF

Single by NF

from the album Perception
- Released: January 22, 2019
- Length: 3:19
- Label: NF Real Music; Capitol; Caroline
- Songwriter(s): Nathan Feuerstein; Tommee Profitt
- Producer(s): NF; Profitt

NF singles chronology
"Why" (2018)	"If You Want Love" (2019)	"The Search" (2019)

Music video
- "If You Want Love" on YouTube

"If You Want Love" is a song by American rapper NF from his third studio album Perception (2017). It was written and produced by NF himself and Tommee Profitt. The song was released to mainstream radio on January 22, 2019 as the fifth single from the album.

== Content ==
The message of the song is that those who seek love should be emotionally invested in their lover: "If you want love, you gon' have to go through the pain / if you want love, you gon' have to learn how to change / if you want trust, you gon' have to give some away". NF also notes how life quickly goes by.

== Critical reception ==
Reviewing Perception for Jesus Freak Hideout, David Croft wrote: "'If You Want Love' is easily the second-best track on the album. Its honest, insightful lyrics can resonate with all listeners".

== Music video ==
An official music video was released on December 7, 2018. It starts with a woman giving birth in a hospital and follows the couple raising the child, including her first steps, play time and her first date as a teenager. Eventually, she grows into an adult and marries.

== Charts ==
Chart performance for "If You Want Love"
Chart (2019)	Peak position
US Pop Airplay (Billboard)	39

== Certifications ==
Certifications for "If You Want Love"
Region	Certification	Certified units/sales
Australia (ARIA)	2× Platinum	140,000^{‡}
Brazil (Pro-Música Brasil)	Gold	30,000^{‡}
Canada (Music Canada)	3× Platinum	240,000^{‡}
Denmark (IFPI Danmark)	Gold	45,000^{‡}
New Zealand (RMNZ)	Platinum	30,000^{‡}
Portugal (AFP)	Gold	5,000^{‡}
United Kingdom (BPI)	Silver	200,000^{‡}
United States (RIAA)	3× Platinum	3,000,000^{‡}
^{‡} Sales+streaming figures based on certification alone.
