= Why (NF song) =

2018 single by NF

Single by NF

from the album The Search
- Released: June 18, 2018
- Genre: Hip hop
- Length: 3:08
- Label: NF Real Music; Capitol
- Songwriters: Nate Feuerstein; Tommee Profitt; Cole Walowac
- Producers: NF; Profitt; Saint X

NF singles chronology
"Lie" (2018)	"Why" (2018)	"If You Want Love" (2019)

Music video
- "Why" on YouTube

"Why" is a song by American rapper NF, released on June 18, 2018, as the lead single from his fourth studio album The Search (2019). It was written and produced by NF himself, Tommee Profitt, and Saint X of Capital Kings.

== Composition ==
The song has been described as similar in style to rapper Hopsin's "Ill Mind" saga, particularly due to its use of "dark, carnival-esque instrumental and the emotional yet violently charged lyrical nature." It finds NF pondering difficult questions, beginning with "what's your definition of success?" He reflects on how he has been questioning his talents since his "Let You Down" was certified triple platinum, as well as his insecurities and feelings of angst. In the end, he admits people do not know him well.

== Music video ==
The music video was released alongside the single. It sees NF holding black balloons and in a dark, abandoned storefront, where he rides in a shopping cart. He can also be seen wearing "Joker-esque" makeup. The video ends with him sitting alone before the screen fades to black.

== Charts ==
Chart (2018)	Peak position
US Bubbling Under Hot 100 (Billboard)	16
US Bubbling Under R&B/Hip-Hop Songs (Billboard)	9
US Digital Song Sales (Billboard)	44

== Certifications ==
Region	Certification	Certified units/sales
Australia (ARIA)	Platinum	70,000^{‡}
Canada (Music Canada)	Platinum	80,000^{‡}
United States (RIAA)	Platinum	1,000,000^{‡}
^{‡} Sales+streaming figures based on certification alone.
