= Clouds (NF song) =

2021 single by NF

Single by NF

from the album Clouds (The Mixtape)
- Released: February 18, 2021
- Genre: Hip hop
- Length: 4:03 (album version); 3:49 (edit)
- Label: NF Real Music
- Songwriters: Nate Feuerstein; Tommee Profitt
- Producers: Profitt; Feuerstein

NF singles chronology
"Chasing_(Demo)" (2020)	"Clouds" (2021)	"Lost" (2021)

Music video
- "Clouds" on YouTube

"Clouds" (stylized in all caps) is a song by American rapper NF, released on February 18, 2021 along with a music video. It is the second single from his mixtape of the same name, and was written and produced by NF and Tommee Profitt. The song has peaked at number 53 on the Billboard Hot 100.

== Background ==
NF teased the song on social media on February 17, 2021. He released it the next day and announced that it will be the title track of his then-upcoming mixtape.

== Composition ==
The song finds NF pondering how he will release music in the future, over a violin instrumental, rapping: "Mixtapes aren't my thing but it's been awfully exhausting / Hanging onto songs this long is daunting".

== Charts ==
Chart (2021)	Peak position
Canada Hot 100 (Billboard)	52
Global 200 (Billboard)	64
Ireland (IRMA)	58
New Zealand Hot Singles (RMNZ)	6
UK Singles (OCC)	56
US Billboard Hot 100	53
US Hot R&B/Hip-Hop Songs (Billboard)	22

== Certifications ==
Region	Certification	Certified units/sales
Australia (ARIA)	Gold	35,000^{‡}
Canada (Music Canada)	Platinum	80,000^{‡}
United States (RIAA)	Platinum	1,000,000^{‡}
^{‡} Sales+streaming figures based on certification alone.
