= Ruelle (singer) =

American singer-songwriter

- Also known as: Ruelle
- Born: Margaret C. Eckford; November 21, 1985 (age 40); Hattiesburg, Mississippi, U.S.
- Genres: Electropop; indie pop
- Occupations: Singer; songwriter
- Years active: 2009–present
- Label: Ruelle Music
- Website: ruellemusic.com

YouTube information
- Channel: Ruelle
- Years active: 2014
- Subscribers: 637 thousand
- Views: 290.5 million
- Last updated: June 9, 2025

Margaret C. Eckford (born November 21, 1985), known by her stage name Ruelle, is an American singer-songwriter. Her music has been used on television series including the opening theme songs of Dynasties ("Game of Survival"), Shadowhunters ("This Is the Hunt"), and The Shannara Chronicles ("Until We Go Down").

== Background ==
Born the middle child of three sisters, Ruelle grew up in Hattiesburg, Mississippi, and attended a private Christian high school. She attended music school in Sydney, Australia. Ruelle is based in Nashville and her mother's family owns a legacy music store in Wales, where her interest for music began.

Ruelle's first two albums, For What It's Worth (2010) and Show and Tell (2012), released under her birth name, Maggie Eckford, were indie pop. She then adopted her stage name from the French word Ruelle, due to its French root and its multiple meanings and shifted to performing electronic pop, releasing the EPs Up in Flames (2015), Madness (2016), and Rival (2017).

Ruelle's first television placement was a song in a Japanese iPad commercial. Alongside the theme songs for Shadowhunters and The Shannara Chronicles, her songs have featured in prime time television series including 9-1-1, Arrow, Batwoman, Inhumans, Dancing with the Stars, The Challenge XXX: Dirty 30, Cloak & Dagger, Eyewitness, Famous in Love, Grey's Anatomy, Guilt, How to Get Away with Murder, The Leftovers; Midnight, Texas; The Originals, Pretty Little Liars, Quantico, Reckless, Reign, Revenge, Riverdale, Scream, Sleepy Hollow, So You Think You Can Dance, Teen Wolf, Titans, The Vampire Diaries, The Walking Dead, Wynonna Earp, Doom Patrol, and The Village.

She was included in both the trailer and soundtrack for The Loft as well as trailers for Bad Moms, Before I Fall, Free State of Jones, and Keeping Up with the Joneses. Her song "Game of Survival" was included in the 13 Reasons Why trailer, the Gears 5 trailer, and the trailer for David Attenborough's BBC Earth series Dynasties. Her songs "Madness" and "Rivals" were included in the TV show Siren and in the trailer for The Looming Tower miniseries, respectively. In July 2018, the released trailer for the Titans series by DC Universe contained "Madness", "Monsters" and "Revolution". She also released the song "Take it All" used in a trailer for the British soap opera Emmerdale. The song "Slip Away" was included in a season 2 episode of Midnight, Texas. The song "Carry You" is used in an episode of the Fox drama series 9-1-1 during season 3, episode 15.

In January 2019, "Wake Up World", a collaborative track with Unsecret, was used as a teaser of the STARZ exclusive limited series The Spanish Princess. "I AM", a collaboration with Club Yoko, was in Samsung Galaxy Note 10 commercials. The single "The World We Made" was included in the soundtrack of the Netflix film The Old Guard in 2020. Her single "Good Day for Dreaming" was featured in Apple's iPhone 12 lineup launch event in October 2020. The song was featured in the final episode of the 2019 sci-fi drama Another Life. Her song "Madness" was included in the soundtrack of the Netflix limited series Behind Her Eyes in 2021. Ruelle has collaborated with electronic music producer Ki Theory and is featured on his song "Bringing Me Down". She was the sole feature on NF's chart-topping 2017 album Perception, providing vocals on the song "10 Feet Down",

Her album Earth Glow was released on August 7, 2019, with five songs and another EP soon after with another five songs. She chose to split her album into two releases in order to draw more attention to the songs. A fellow artist and close friend wrote "Like You Mean It" with Ruelle, alongside mutual friend Jeremy Lutito of Jars of Clay who also co-produced the EP. The second EP, Exodus, was released on the November 22, 2019.

== Personal life ==
Ruelle and Ian Keaggy (of Hot Chelle Rae) were in a relationship for three-and-a-half years. She had been convinced she would marry him but ended their relationship after she realized that they were on "different pages". She was devastated but met a man named Jess six months later. After five months of dating, they married in December 2015. They have two daughters.

As of 2017, she lives in Nashville.

== Discography ==
=== As Maggie Eckford ===
==== Albums ====
For What It's Worth

1. "Couldn't I See "
2. "Over and Over"
3. "Asleep "
4. "Don't Ask Me"
5. "My Own Way Down"
6. "For What It's Worth"
7. "Unexpected"
8. "You'll Still Be Mine"
9. "Raindrops"

Show and Tell

1. "Come and Go"
2. "The Pirate and the Mermaid"
3. "Show and Tell"
4. "What If"
5. "Leave"
6. "Too Far Gone"
7. "Two Worlds"
8. "What Are We Waiting For"
9. "Something for Me"
10. "Lullaby"

==== Singles ====
- "Golden"
- "Christmas Like We Do"
- "Tell Me How to Feel"
- "Ghost" (2014)
- "Let the Light Back In" (2015)
- "Everything Is Lost" (2015)

=== As Ruelle ===
==== Albums ====
Ode to Shadows (2019)

1. "Monsters"
2. "War of Hearts"
3. "Invincible"
4. "The Other Side"
5. "Bad Dream"
6. "Where We Come Alive"
7. "Carry You" (featuring Fleurie)
8. "Where Do We Go from Here"
9. "Recover"
10. "Storm"
11. "I Get to Love You"
12. "Hold Your Breath"
13. "Fire Meets Fate"

==== EPs ====
Up In Flames (2015)

1. "Up in Flames"
2. "Fear on Fire"
3. "Big Guns"
4. "Oh My My"
5. "War of Hearts"
6. "Until We Go Down"

Madness (2016)

1. "Madness"
2. "Bad Dream"
3. "Where Do We Go from Here"
4. "Live Like Legends"
5. "Daydream"
6. "Game of Survival"
7. "Closing In"

Rival (2017)

1. "Dead of Night"
2. "Secrets and Lies"
3. "Recover"
4. "Find You"
5. "Rival"
6. "The Other Side"

Emerge (2018)

1. "Emerge Part I"
2. "Emerge Part II"
3. "Genesis"
4. "Come Fly with Me"
5. "Empires"
6. "Hold Your Breath"
7. "Waves of Gray"

Earth Glow (2019)

1. "Can't Stand Still"
2. "Earth Glow"
3. "What Dreams Are Made Of"
4. "Like You Mean It"
5. "Take It Out on You"

Exodus (2019)

1. "What Are We Waiting For"
2. "Exodus"
3. "Skin and Bones"
4. "The Fear of Letting Go"
5. "Ten Years"

Somebody Else (2022)

1. "In It"
2. "Self Sabotage"
3. "Good Thing"
4. "Hallelu"
5. "Somebody Else"

==== Singles ====
- "Take It All" (2015)
- "Deep End" (2015)
- "Monsters" (2015)
- "I Get to Love You" (2016)
- "Storm" (2016)
- "Until We Go Down (Listenbe"e remix)
- "Gotta Love It" (2016)
- "Monsters" (acoustic version)
- "War of Hearts" (acoustic version)
- "Carry You" (featuring Fleurie) (2019)
- "Where We Come Alive" (2018)
- "The World We Made" (2019)
- "Love Changes Everything" (2020)
- "Good Day For Dreaming" (2020)
- "Slow Motion Memory Fade" (2026)

==== Soundtrack appearances ====
- "The World We Made"
- "This Is the Hunt "
- "War of Hearts"
- "I Get to Love You"
- "Secrets and Lies"
- "Trigger"
- "Where We Come Alive"

==== Featuring ====
- Super Duper | "Finale" (featuring Ruelle)
- Zayde Wølf | "Walk Through the Fire" (featuring Ruelle)
- Tommee Profitt | "Whose Side Are You On" (featuring Ruelle)
- Ki:Theory | "Bringing Me Down" (remixes)
  1. "Bringing Me Down" (featuring Ruelle)
  2. "Bringing Me Down" (Instrumental)
  3. "Bringing Me Down" (Liam Back remix) [featuring Ruelle]
  4. "Bringing Me Down" (Bedtimes remix) [featuring Ruelle]
  5. "Bringing Me Down" (Nerve Leak remix) [featuring Ruelle]
  6. "Bringing Me Down" (Noisecream remix) [featuring Ruelle]
  7. "Bringing Me Down" (Hykuu remix) [featuring Ruelle]
- NF | "10 Feet Down" (featuring Ruelle)
- UNSECRET | "Wake Up World" (featuring Ruelle)
- UNSECRET | "Revolution" (featuring Ruelle)
- Happy Walters | "Wonder" (featuring Ruelle)
- Tommee Profitt | "Follow Me" (featuring Ruelle)
- Silverberg | "Giants" (featuring Ruelle)
- Sam Tinnesz | "Play with Fire" (Alternate Version) [featuring Ruelle & Violents]
- Hidden Citizens | "Take Over" (featuring Ruelle)
- UNSECRET | "Slip Away" (featuring Ruelle)
- UNSECRET | "Hang On a Little Longer" (featuring Ruelle)
- Dave | "Lesley" (featuring Ruelle), BPI: Silver
- Future Utopia | "Mountain Girl" (featuring Ruelle)
