= Who I Was =

2025 song by NF featuring MGK

Promotional single by NF featuring Machine Gun Kelly

from the EP Fear
- Released: November 13, 2025
- Genre: Hip-hop; pop
- Length: 3:01
- Label: NF; Capitol
- Songwriters: Nathan Feuerstein; Colson Baker; Jeff Sojka; Aaron Chafin
- Producers: NF; Jeff Sojka; Aaron Chafin

"Who I Was" (stylized in all caps) is a song by American rapper NF featuring American musician MGK. It was released on November 13, 2025, as a promotional single from NF's third EP Fear, which was released the next day. The song was produced by NF, Jeff Sojka and Aaron Chafin.

== Composition ==
The song uses a stripped-down instrumental, over which MGK raps about losing friends, distancing himself from toxic influences, and picking up the pieces after the end of a relationship, referring to his high-profile breakup with actress Megan Fox. NF performs in two contrasting vocal deliveries: a softer, "self-aware" cadence and a harsher, frustrated tone that reflects his inner conflict.

== Charts ==
Chart performance for "Who I Was"
Chart (2025)	Peak position
Canada Hot 100 (Billboard)	57
Global 200 (Billboard)	151
New Zealand Hot Singles (RMNZ)	5
UK Singles (Official Charts)	76
US Billboard Hot 100	62
US Hot R&B/Hip-Hop Songs (Billboard)	13
