= The Joy (The Neverclaim album) =

Studio album by The Neverclaim
- Released: July 17, 2015
- Genre: Contemporary Christian music, indie rock, power pop
- Length: 35:28
- Label: Radiate, The Fuel
- Producer: Ian Eskelin

The Neverclaim chronology
The Neverclaim (2013)	The Joy (2015)

The Joy is the second studio album by The Neverclaim. Radiate Music alongside The Fuel Music released the album on July 17, 2015. The Neverclaim worked with producer, Ian Eskelin, in the making of this album. The album was funded through a PledgeMusic campaign.

== Critical reception ==
Professional ratings
Review scores
Source	Rating
365 Days of Inspiring Media	4/5 stars
Alpha Omega News	A−
CCM Magazine	4/5 stars
The Christian Beat	4.0/5
Christian Music Review	3.8/5
Jesus Freak Hideout	2.5/5 stars
New Release Today	4.5/5 stars
Worship Leader	4.5/5 stars

Awarding the album four stars from CCM Magazine, Rebekah Bell states, "The band's pop-rock style is fresh, energetic, and compelling—filled with songs that fans will want to listen to time and again." Marcus Hathcock, giving the album four and a half stars for New Release Today, writes, "throughout the 10 tracks of The Joy, all with passionate and musically excellent flair."

Indicating in a four and a half star review at Worship Leader, Amanda Furbeck describes, "The Neverclaim is back with another heart, soul, and ear pleasing pop-rock album, The Joy." Rating the album 3.8 out of five by Christian Music Review, Kelly Meade says, "The Joy is full of uplifting & encouraging songs that focus on the power of faith and the promises found in a relationship with our Savior."

Joshua Andre, awarding the album four out of five stars at 365 Days of Inspiring Media, describes, "lyrically these 11 tracks are some of the most honest that I’ve heard from a sophomore album". Giving the album two and a half stars from Jesus Freak Hideout, Christopher Smith opines, "When an album feels like a product of the system the way The Joy does, it's hard to see the value in its creation."

Signaling in a 4.0 out of five review from The Christian Beat, Sarah Baylor replies, "The Neverclaim’s new album, The Joy, is an anthem, a cry for every believer in this broken world. Each song is beautifully crafted into praise and worship for our God, but they also encourage believers to stand up for their faith and not be afraid about it...Each chorus of every song is powerful, not just musically, but also lyrically."

== Track listing ==
Track list
No.	Title	Writer(s)	Length
1.	"The Joy"	Jeremiah Carlson, Ian Eskelin	3:16
2.	"Dance with God"	Carlson, Eskelin	3:26
3.	"Jesus Is"	Carlson, Eskelin, Barry Weeks, Tony Wood	2:49
4.	"Go"	Carlson, Allen Salmon	2:54
5.	"Everything"	Carlson, Eskelin, Wood	2:57
6.	"Our God Wins"	Carlson, Eskelin, Antonio Giovanni Porcheddu	3:00
7.	"Rise Up"	Carlson, Eskelin, Wood	3:01
8.	"Rules and Reigns"	Carlson, Eskelin	3:28
9.	"Perfect God"	Carlson, Eskelin, Steve Jones	3:46
10.	"Mighty Men of God"	Carlson, Eskelin, Wood	3:10
11.	"Through Christ"	Josh Bronlewee, Carlson, Benji Cowart	3:38
Total length:			35:28
