= Clouds (The Mixtape) =

Mixtape by NF
- Released: March 26, 2021
- Genre: Hip-hop
- Length: 42:27
- Label: NF Real Music

NF chronology
The Search (2019)	Clouds (The Mixtape) (2021)	Hope (2023)

Singles from Clouds (The Mixtape)
- 1. "Paid My Dues" Released: December 3, 2019; 2. "Clouds" Released: February 18, 2021; 3. "Lost" Released: March 11, 2021

Professional ratings
Review scores
Source	Rating
AllMusic	3.5/5 stars

Clouds (The Mixtape) (with "clouds" stylized in all caps) is a commercial mixtape by American rapper NF. The mixtape was released on March 26, 2021, through his independent label (NF Real Music) with guest appearances from Hopsin and Tech N9ne. It was preceded by the singles "Paid My Dues", "Clouds", and "Lost".

== Track listing ==
Clouds (The Mixtape) track listing
No.	Title	Writer(s)	Producer(s)	Length
1.	"Clouds"	Nate Feuerstein; Thomas Tommee Profitt	Feuerstein; Profitt	4:04
2.	"That's a Joke"	Feuerstein; Profitt	Feuerstein; Profitt	3:50
3.	"Just Like You"	Feuerstein; Profitt	Feuerstein; Profitt	4:11
4.	"Story"	Feuerstein; Profitt	Feuerstein; Profitt	4:40
5.	"Prideful"	Cole Walowac; Feuerstein; Profitt	Feuerstein; Saint X; Profitt	3:26
6.	"Lost" (featuring Hopsin)	Marcus Hopson; Walowac; Feuerstein; Profitt	Feuerstein; Saint X; Profitt; Anthony Smith	3:55
7.	"Layers"	Walowac; Feuerstein; Profitt	Feuerstein; Saint X; Profitt	3:15
8.	"Drifting"	Feuerstein; Profitt	Feuerstein; Profitt	3:20
9.	"Trust" (featuring Tech N9ne)	Aaron D. Yates; Cole Walowac; Feuerstein; Profitt	Feuerstein; Saint X; Profitt; Anthony Smith	4:24
10.	"Paid My Dues"	Walowac; Feuerstein; Profitt	Feuerstein; Saint X; Profitt	3:32
11.	"Clouds" (edit)	Feuerstein; Profitt	Feuerstein; Profitt	3:50
Total length:				42:27

== Charts ==
=== Weekly charts ===
Weekly chart performance for Clouds (The Mixtape)
Chart (2021)	Peak position
Australian Albums (ARIA)	5
Austrian Albums (Ö3 Austria)	13
Belgian Albums (Ultratop Flanders)	13
Belgian Albums (Ultratop Wallonia)	99
Danish Albums (Hitlisten)	35
Dutch Albums (Album Top 100)	18
Finnish Albums (Suomen virallinen lista)	16
German Albums (Offizielle Top 100)	20
Irish Albums (Official Charts)	21
Lithuanian Albums (AGATA)	9
New Zealand Albums (RMNZ)	11
Norwegian Albums (VG-lista)	23
Scottish Albums (Official Charts)	29
Swedish Albums (Sverigetopplistan)	27
Swiss Albums (Schweizer Hitparade)	18
UK Albums (Official Charts)	12
UK Christian & Gospel Albums (Official Charts)	1
UK R&B Albums (Official Charts)	1
US Billboard 200	3
US Independent Albums (Billboard)	1
US Top R&B/Hip-Hop Albums (Billboard)	2

=== Year-end charts ===
Year-end chart performance for Clouds (The Mixtape)
Chart (2021)	Position
US Top R&B/Hip-Hop Albums (Billboard)	79

== Certifications ==
Certifications for Clouds (The Mixtape)
Region	Certification	Certified units/sales
Canada (Music Canada)	Gold	40,000^{‡}
United Kingdom (BPI)	Silver	60,000^{‡}
United States (RIAA)	Gold	500,000^{‡}
^{‡} Sales+streaming figures based on certification alone.
