= Sorry (NF and James Arthur song) =

2025 single by NF and James Arthur

Promotional single by NF featuring James Arthur

from the EP Fear
- Released: November 14, 2025
- Length: 3:11
- Label: NF Real Music; Capitol
- Songwriters: Nathan Feuerstein; Jeff Sojka
- Producers: Feuerstein; Sojka; Aaron Chafin

"Sorry" (stylized in all caps) is a song by American rapper NF, featuring English singer James Arthur. It was released on November 13, 2025, as a promotional single from the NF's third EP, Fear, which was released the next day.

It was produced by Aaron Chafin, Jeff Sojka, and NF. "Sorry" peaked at number 6 on the New Zealand Hot Singles chart, number 70 on the Billboard Hot 100, number 73 on the UK Singles chart, and number 192 on the Global 200 chart.

== Writing and production ==
The lyrics of "Sorry" revolve around accountability and broken promises. In the song, NF reflects on broken trust. James Arthur contributes to the chorus, contrasting to NF’s rap delivery.

The song fits into the broader theme of Fear, which focuses on mental health, self-reflection, and emotional vulnerability, and was praised for its "intimate atmosphere" and its raw, acoustic style balancing rap and pop.

== Release and promotion ==
"Sorry" was released as a promotional single for NF's Fear EP, which was NF’s first release since his 2023 album Hope. The EP was a 6-track release featuring collaborations with Machine Gun Kelly and James Arthur, and charted at #4 on the Billboard 200, selling over 76,000 units in the first week.

The release was part of a competitive chart week that included major albums by Summer Walker and 5 Seconds of Summer, with Taylor Swift and Morgan Wallen topping the week's chart.

== Reception ==
=== Critical ===
Reviews of Fear reacted to NF's shift in Fear to a more pop-like style with mixed opinions. However, "Sorry" was singled out by some commentators as one of the EP’s most "emotionally vulnerable" songs, highlighting James Arthur’s feature.

=== Commercial ===
Following the release of Fear, "Sorry" charted in multiple countries. It reached number 6 on the New Zealand Hot Singles chart, number 73 on the UK Singles Chart, and number 72 in Canada. The song also charted on the Billboard Global 200 at number 192 and peaked at number 70 on the Billboard Hot 100.

== Personnel ==
Credits adapted from Tidal Music.

- Aaron Chafin – producer, programmer, engineer, guitar
- Jeff Sojka – producer, writer, programmer, engineer
- Nathan Feuerstein – producer, writer
- James Arthur – featured vocals

== Charts ==
Chart (2025–2026)	Peak position
Canada Hot 100 (Billboard)	72
Global 200 (Billboard)	192
New Zealand Hot Singles (RMNZ)	6
Switzerland (Schweizer Hitparade)	93
UK Singles (Official Charts)	73
UK Christian Airplay (Cross Rhythms)	1
US Billboard Hot 100	70
