= How Could You Leave Us =

2016 song by NF

Song by NF

from the album Therapy Session
- Released: April 22, 2016
- Genre: Hip hop
- Length: 5:22
- Label: Capitol CMG
- Songwriters: Nathan Feuerstein; Tommee Profitt
- Producer: Profitt

Music video
- "How Could You Leave Us" on YouTube

"How Could You Leave Us" is a song by American rapper NF from his second studio album Therapy Session (2016). It was produced by Tommee Profitt.

== Content ==
In the song, NF addresses his mother and her death from a drug overdose. He raps about feeling abandoned as a kid, due to her addiction, and struggling to deal with her absence following her death. He sobs in the background while singing to her and tearfully talks to his mother in the outro.

== Critical reception ==
Kevin Hoskins of Jesus Freak Hideout described the song as "one of the most emotionally gripping tracks I have heard in a long time as Nate opens his heart and past like a book for all of us to read with the ending product being absolutely stunning." Carlin Doyle of Reel Gospel called it "beautiful and heartbreaking."

== Music video ==
The music video was released on January 30, 2017.

== Charts ==
Chart (2016)	Peak position
US Hot Christian Songs (Billboard)	23

== Certifications ==
Region	Certification	Certified units/sales
Australia (ARIA)	Platinum	70,000^{‡}
Canada (Music Canada)	Platinum	80,000^{‡}
New Zealand (RMNZ)	Gold	15,000^{‡}
United States (RIAA)	Platinum	1,000,000^{‡}
^{‡} Sales+streaming figures based on certification alone.
