= NF (EP) =

EP by NF
- Released: August 5, 2014
- Genre: Christian hip-hop; urban contemporary gospel
- Length: 23:32
- Label: Capitol CMG/Sparrow
- Producer: NF; Tommee Profitt

NF chronology
I'm Free (2012)	NF (2014)	Mansion (2015)

Singles from NF
- 1. "All I Have" Released: July 22, 2014

NF is the eponymous second extended play by American rapper NF. Capitol Christian Music Group alongside Sparrow Records released the project on August 5, 2014. It was written and produced entirely with Tommee Profitt.

== Reception ==
Professional ratings
Review scores
Source	Rating
CCM Magazine	4/5 stars
Jesus Freak Hideout	3.5/5 stars
New Release Tuesday	3.5/5 stars

Specifying in a four star review by CCM Magazine, Matt Conner responds, "NF, Nate's six-song EP, is a stellar first step." Kevin Hoskins, indicating for Jesus Freak Hideout in a three and a half star review, recognizes, the album is "He can spit, the beats are stellar, and he is as emotionally charged for God and willing to be as honest as they come." Signaling in a three and a half star review from New Release Tuesday, Mark Ryan realizes, "What we have here is a raw rapper with a penchant for lyricism and, as an added bonus, he can sing his own hooks."

== Track listing ==
All tracks written and produced by NF and Tommee Profitt

No.	Title	Length
1.	"All I Have"	4:08
2.	"Wake Up"	3:53
3.	"Hands Up"	3:19
4.	"Only One"	3:35
5.	"Thing Called Love"	4:54
6.	"Just Being Me"	3:43
Total length:		23:32

== Charts ==
Chart performance for NF
Chart (2014-2019)	Peak position
UK Christian & Gospel Albums (OCC)	9
US Top Christian Albums (Billboard)	12
US Top Gospel Albums (Billboard)	4
US Top Rap Albums (Billboard)	15
