= The Neverclaim (album) =

Studio album by The Neverclaim
- Released: September 24, 2013
- Genres: Contemporary Christian music, Christian rock, pop rock
- Length: 39:23
- Label: Essential
- Producers: Jason Ingram, Paul Moak

The Neverclaim chronology
Revival (2012)	The Neverclaim (2013)	The Joy (2015)

The Neverclaim is the debut studio album from contemporary Christian music band The Neverclaim, which was released on September 24, 2013 by Essential Records, and it was produced by Jason Ingram and Paul Moak. The album has seen commercial charting successes, as well as, it has received critical acclamation by Christian reviewers.

== Background ==
The album was released on September 24, 2013 by Essential Records, and it was produced by Jason Ingram and Paul Moak. This was the first album for the sestet's career.

== Music and lyrics ==
At Cross Rhythms, Stephen Curry told that the "Lead singer Jeremiah Carlson has a distinctive tone which complements the band's southern US rock music approach which is not unlike Third Day." Andrea Hunter of Worship Leader stated that the release was "An amalgam of classic, alt and modern rock, with country, roots, and pop inflections—electric and acoustic—are the backdrop for lead singer Jeremiah’s Carlson’s evocative vocals and passionate songwriting." In addition, Hunter said that "With a solid scriptural foundation and unrelenting passion—huge, dynamic, yet sensitive and fluid, reminiscent of Kings of Leon, yet completely in the now—The Neverclaim delivers a release with a youth vibe that is equally suited for church, times of private worship, concert halls, and arenas."

Matt Conner of CCM Magazine told how "If you filtered modern worship through the 'Ho! Hey!' pop-folk movement you may come close to The Neverclaim's self-titled debut." Also, Conner said the album has "Traditional instrumentation is set alongside familiar pop-rock elements to varied effect" on the album. At New Release Tuesday, Kevin Davis wrote that "If you've been desperately waiting for a fresh filling of The Holy Spirit-led worship that is truly unashamed of the Gospel of Jesus Christ, then don't miss out on this incredible album, one of the best of the year for sure. If you feel like most of what you sing in church sounds the same, and you want to experience an uplifting soul-stirring and completely worshipful album, look no further than The Neverclaim." Jay Heilman at Christian Music Review noted that "The energy and message that permeates this album is obvious – one that I believe will resonate in the hearts of listeners and encourage them to line their walks up with that of Christ, the One who we should observe above all else." Rob Snyder of Alpha Omega News stated that "The musicianship is outstanding."

At Christian Music Zine, Joshua Andre said that "There’s enough star-studded power in the making of this record to keep me interested, and also probably other listeners too. With the band name inspired by how the band do not want to claim God’s glory as their own, and instead want to give Him the praise, honour and recognition in everything; lyrically these 10 tracks are some of the most honest that I’ve heard from a label debut." Mark Geil of Jesus Freak Hideout wrote that "The production by Paul Moak [...] and Jason Ingram [...], is solid, and the album fits nicely in the collection of fans of Third Day and Needtobreathe." Furthermore, Jesus Freak Hideout's Bert Gangl told that "Rather than trying desperately to combine their divergent musical influences into some sort of coherent whole, they and their bandmates have wisely opted to start from scratch for the self-titled national freshman effort."

== Critical reception ==
Professional ratings
Review scores
Source	Rating
Alpha Omega News	A
CCM Magazine	3/5 stars
Christian Music Review	5/5 stars
Christian Music Zine	4.5/5 stars
Cross Rhythms	8/10 squares
Jesus Freak Hideout	3.5/5 stars
Jesus Freak Hideout	3/5 stars
New Release Tuesday	4.5/5 stars
The Phantom Tollbooth	3/5 stars
Worship Leader	4.5/5 stars

The Neverclaim garnered critical acclaim from the Christian music critics. Stephen Curry of Cross Rhythms felt that they are "Clearly a band on the way to establishing a national reputation." At Worship Leader, Andrea Hunter called this "A collection of both new and previously released originals, The Neverclaim revisits some of the band’s most compelling releases with fresh arrangements." Kevin Davis of New Release Tuesday evoked that "The Neverclaim is the most clearly Jesus-focused collection of worship songs I may have ever heard, which is so refreshing in this musical era of ambiguity and euphemisms."

At Christian Music Review, Jay Heilman proclaimed the release to be "A triumph and a great start to what I believe will be a long and illustrious career." Rob Snyder of Alpha Omega News felt "This is a great start and perhaps in the future the band can elevate their vertical lyrics beyond the all-too common", however he did affirm that "The band's debut is impressive." Joshua Andre of Christian Music Zine wrote that "It is true that The Neverclaim seem to be a conglomerate or mishmash of Third Day, Newsong and needtobreathe, yet they also have forged their own identity with their country southern musical roots mixed in with their worshipful heart." At The Phantom Tollbooth, Scott S. Mertens said that the album "has a powerful, refreshing energy pulling at our hearts to come closer to Christ."

Matt Conner of CCM Magazine evoked how some songs work and yet other don't, but wrote that "there's a solid enough foundation here to expect much more from this sextet." At Jesus Freak Hideout, Mark Geil felt that "On The Neverclaim, sometimes it is, with lyrics and musical settings that don't offer much innovation. However, thankfully, most of the time this music is inventive and well worth a listen." In addition, Geil alluded to how he saw that "There is strong potential here, and The Neverclaim is a band to watch for the future." However, Bert Gangl of Jesus Freak Hideout stated that the release "while certainly pleasant enough, falls just shy of etching out a unique musical identity for its creators."

== Commercial performance ==
For the Billboard charting week of October 12, 2013, The Neverclaim was the No. 47 Top Heatseekers Album. For the Billboard charting week of October 19, 2013, The Neverclaim was the No. 48 Top Christian Album, and it was the No. 34 Top Heatseekers album, which it gained from the previous week.

== Track listing ==
Track list
No.	Title	Writer(s)	Length
1.	"Revival"	Jeremiah Carlson	3:17
2.	"One Truth One Life"	Carlson, Mitchell Maldonado, Allen Salmon	3:21
3.	"Pearl of Great Price"	Carlson, Jonathan Smith, Tony Wood	4:06
4.	"Steal Their Hearts"	Carlson, Scott Krippayne, Tony Wood	3:18
5.	"My Soul Longs"	Carlson	3:56
6.	"Mighty Jesus"	Carlson, Stuart Garrard	4:55
7.	"Burn"	Carlson	4:07
8.	"Be Lifted Higher"	Chuck Butler, Carlson, Chad Cates, Jason Ingram	3:57
9.	"Sweet Sweet Mercies"	Carlson, Salmon	4:01
10.	"Enthroned on High (Holy, Holy, Holy)" (featuring Lindsay McCaul)	Carlson	4:25
Total length:			39:23

== Charts ==
Chart (2013)	Peak position
US Top Christian Albums (Billboard)	48
US Top Heatseekers Albums (Billboard)	34
