= Paid My Dues (NF song) =

2019 single by NF

Single by NF

from the album Clouds (The Mixtape)
- Released: December 3, 2019
- Genre: Hip hop
- Length: 3:32
- Label: NF Real Music
- Songwriters: Nate Feuerstein; Tommee Profitt; Cole Walowac
- Producers: Feuerstein; Profitt; Saint X

NF singles chronology
"Time" (2019)	"Paid My Dues" (2019)	"Chasing_Demo" (2020)

Music video
- "Paid My Dues" on YouTube

"Paid My Dues" is a song by American rapper NF. It was released on December 3, 2019, as the lead single from his first mixtape Clouds (2021). Written and produced alongside Tommee Profitt and Saint X of Capital Kings, NF calls out critics and their hypocrisy, showing how he made his path to success and overcoming obstacles that he faced along the way. A music video was released the same day as the song

== Composition and lyrics ==
In the song, NF raps about the audacity for critics to have an opinion on his music and the criticism he receives, before criticizing them himself, stating "I read your article, it kinda hurt me / I don't know who hired you or what your friends say in your circle / But the fact that you released it tells me two things are for certain: / They get paid for trashin' people, I get paid 'cause I stay workin'". He then continues by going into the topic of facing his battles, overcoming them, and working to produce the content that made him successful. It has a similar theme to his previous album, The Search, showing how he is lost and finding his way out.

== Critical reception ==
A contributor from Billboard says that he "kick[ed] the song into an even higher gear with his trademark rapid-fire delivery", with Jonathan Currinn from CelebMix stating that "he certainly doesn't disappoint."

== Personnel ==
Credits adapted from Tidal.

- Nate Feuerstein – composer, lyricist, producer
- Tommee Profitt – composer, lyricist, producer, mastering engineer, mixer, studio personnel
- Cole Walowac/Saint X – lyricist, producer

== Charts ==
Chart (2019)	Peak position
Canada Hot Canadian Digital Song Sales (Billboard)	38
New Zealand Hot Singles (RMNZ)	30
US Bubbling Under Hot 100 (Billboard)	6
US Digital Song Sales (Billboard)	15
US Rap Digital Song Sales (Billboard)	1
US R&B/Hip-Hop Digital Song Sales (Billboard)	3

== Certifications ==
Region	Certification	Certified units/sales
Australia (ARIA)	Gold	35,000^{‡}
Canada (Music Canada)	Gold	40,000^{‡}
United States (RIAA)	Gold	500,000^{‡}
^{‡} Sales+streaming figures based on certification alone.
