= Lost (NF song) =

2021 single by NF featuring Hopsin

Single by NF featuring Hopsin

from the album Clouds (The Mixtape)
- Released: March 11, 2021
- Genre: Hip hop
- Length: 3:55
- Label: NF Real Music
- Songwriters: Nate Feuerstein; Tommee Profitt; Cole Walowac; Marcus Hopson
- Producers: Feuerstein; Profitt; Saint X

NF singles chronology
"Clouds" (2021)	"Lost" (2021)	"Hope" (2023)

Hopsin singles chronology
"Your House" (2021)	"Lost" (2021)	"Alone With Me" (2021)

Music video
- "Lost" on YouTube

"Lost" (stylized in all caps) is a song by American rapper NF featuring fellow American rapper Hopsin, released on March 11, 2021 as the third and final single from the former's mixtape Clouds. The song was written by NF, Tommee Profitt, Saint X of Capital Kings, and Hopsin, while being produced by the former three. The latter's first entry on the Billboard Hot 100 chart, it is lyrically about feeling lost and finding oneself.

== Background ==
NF first teased his collaboration with Hopsin in July 2020 with a photo of them in a snowy landscape.

== Music video ==
The music video was released on March 11, 2021 and directed by NF and Patrick Tohill. It was filmed in the Colorado mountains and finds NF with a number of balloons tied to him, as he and Hopsin wander through the snowy mountains to find their way.

== Charts ==
Chart (2021)	Peak position
Canada Hot 100 (Billboard)	61
Global 200 (Billboard)	137
Ireland (IRMA)	85
New Zealand Hot Singles (RMNZ)	15
UK Singles (OCC)	88
US Billboard Hot 100	79
US Hot R&B/Hip-Hop Songs (Billboard)	33

== Certifications ==
Region	Certification	Certified units/sales
Canada (Music Canada)	Gold	40,000^{‡}
United States (RIAA)	Gold	500,000^{‡}
^{‡} Sales+streaming figures based on certification alone.
