= Fear (EP) =

EP by NF
- Released: November 14, 2025
- Genres: Pop; hip hop
- Length: 21:48
- Labels: NF; Capitol
- Producers: Jeff Sojka; NF; Aaron Chafin

NF chronology
Hope (2023)	Fear (2025)

Fear (stylized in all caps) is the third extended play by American rapper NF. The EP was released on November 14, 2025, via NF Real Music and Capitol Music Group, to CD, LP, digital download, and streaming formats. It features guest appearances from MGK and James Arthur. The EP was produced by Jeff Sojka, NF, and Aaron Chafin.

Fear was supported by the release of two promotional singles, "Sorry" and "Who I Was". "Sorry" peaked at No. 6 on the Recorded Music NZ Hot Singles chart, and "Who I Was" peaked at No. 5. The title track, "Fear", and the song "Washed Up", were both promoted by music videos.

The EP was a commercial success upon release, earning 76,000 equivalent album units, 48,000 of which in sales, and 36.76 million on demand streams, within its first week. The EP debuted at No. 4 on the Billboard 200, concurrently leading the Top Rap Albums chart and Top Album Sales chart. Of Fear's six songs, "Fear", "Home", "Who I Was", "Give Me a Reason", and "Sorry" debuted in the Billboard Hot 100 chart at respective positions of Nos. 35, 86, 62, 85, and 70. "Washed Up" did not enter the Hot 100, but peaked at 9 on the Bubbling Under Hot 100 Singles chart.

== Release and promotion ==
Following the release of Hope in 2023, NF went on a two-year hiatus. In 2025, via a social media post, he released a five-second clip of himself wearing a sack over his head, hinting at upcoming music. In a later post, he revealed the release date, cover art, and track listing of the EP.

Predating the release of any of the album's tracks, teasers for the songs were released to social media. They garnered significant attention, receiving an accumulation of more than twenty-two million views by the release of the EP.

Fear was supported by the release of two promotional singles, "Sorry" and "Who I Was", both released on November 13, 2025. On November 14, 2025, with the EP's release, the title track, "Fear", and the closing track, "Washed Up", were both supported by music videos.

== Writing and production ==
The lyrics of the EP demonstrate NF questioning whether he has obsessive–compulsive disorder or schizophrenia. The songs "Home" and "Sorry" do not feature any rapping, as opposed to the rest of the EP. The EP has been recognized for the honesty in its lyrics.

The EP features production credits from Jeff Sojka, Nathan Feuerstein, and Aaron Chalin. It features writing credits from Sojka, Feuerstein, Chafin, Colson Baker, Gerson Zaragoza, Jason Wool, Lauren Santi, Mario Dragoi, and Nichol Eskridge. Chafin and Sojka programmed, Alex Dobbert and Sojka mastered, and Chafin, Doug Weier, and Sojka mixed.

The track "Who I Was" only appears on digital and streaming releases, and not physical releases.

=== Style ===
Fear demonstrates the styles of pop and hip hop music.

== Artwork ==
The album artwork from NF's previous releases demonstrated symbolism; the mansion from his debut album, Mansion (2015) depicted his mind, the balloons from The Search (2019) depicted his thoughts, and the cover for Fear depict the mansion being burned.

== Reception ==
Professional ratings
Review scores
Source	Rating
RGM	85%

=== Critical ===
RGM gave the album a score of 85%, describing the EP as "a deeply vulnerable body of work that peels back more layers than we’ve ever seen from him" and a "gripping emotional journey".

=== Commercial ===
Fear earned 76,000 equivalent album units, 48,000 in pure album sales, and garnered 36.76 million digital streaming in its opening week, becoming the biggest rap album debut of 2025. It debuted at No. 4 on the Billboard 200, supportively leading the Top Album Sales chart and hitting No. 10 on the Top Streaming Albums chart. Internationally, the EP debuted on Billboard Canadian Albums chart at No. 9, No. 14 on the New Zealand Albums chart, and No. 14 on the UK Official Albums chart, amongst entering other various countries' charts.

Within Fear's first charting week, four of the EP's six tracks charted on the Recorded Music NZ Hot Singles chart. "Sorry" and "Who I Was" peaked at Nos. 6 and 5, respectively, while "Home" peaked at No. 7. Five of the album's six tracks entered the Billboard Hot 100, with "Fear" at No. 35, "Home" at No. 86, "Who I Was" at No. 62, "Give Me A Reason" at No. 85, and "Sorry" at No. 70. Four tracks debuted on the Hot R&B/Hip-Hop Songs chart, including "Fear" at No. 6, "Who I Was" at No. 13, "Give Me a Reason" at No. 21, and "Washed Up" at No. 32. Three songs debuted in the Global 200, including "Fear" at No. 62, "Who I Was" at No. 151, and "Sorry" at No. 192. Each song from the album received an average of 6.1 million streams within its first week.

=== Accolades ===
Year	Organization	Nominee / work	Category	Result	Ref.
2025	We Love Awards	"Fear"	Mainstream Impact Award	Nominated	

Year-end lists
Publication	Accolade	Rank	Ref.
Jesus Freak Hideout	David Craft's Album Picks of 2025	1	
Jesus Freak Hideout	Eric McClanahan's Album Picks of 2025	7	

== Track listing ==
All tracks stylized in all caps.

No.	Title	Writer(s)	Producer(s)	Length
1.	"Fear"	Jeff Sojka; Nathan Feuerstein	Aaron Chafin; Jeff Sojka; Nathan Feuerstein	4:29
2.	"Home"	Aaron Chafin; Sojka; Feuerstein	Chafin; Sojka; Feuerstein	4:44
3.	"Who I Was (Note: "Who I Was" does not appear on physical formats.)" (featuring Machine Gun Kelly)	Chafin; Colson Baker; Sojka; Feuerstein	Chafin; Sojka; Feuerstein	3:01
4.	"Give Me a Reason"	Sojka; Feuerstein	Sojka; Feuerstein	3:03
5.	"Sorry" (with James Arthur)	Chafin; Sojka; Feuerstein	Chafin; Sojka; Feuerstein	3:12
6.	"Washed Up"	Gerson Zaragoza; Jason Wool; Sojka; Lauren Santi; Mario Dragoi; Feuerstein; Nichol Eskridge	Sojka; Feuerstein	3:19
Total length:				21:48

== Personnel ==
Credits adapted from Tidal Music.

- Aaron Chafin – producer (1–3, 5), writer (2–3, 5), programmer (1–2, 4–5), engineer (1–2, 5), guitar (1–2, 5), bass (2, 5), recording engineer (2, 5), mixer (5)
- Alex Dobbert – masterer (1–2, 4–6)
- Brad O'Donnell – artists and repertoire
- Colson Baker – writer (3)
- Doug Weier – mixer (2, 5)
- George Tizzard – recording engineer (5)
- Gerson Zaragoza – writer (6)
- Jason Wool – writer (6)
- Jeff Sojka – producer, writer, programmer (1–2, 4–6), bass (1–2, 4–6), engineer (1–2, 4–6), guitar (1, 5), mixer (1, 3–6), recording engineer (1–3, 4–6), strings (1–2, 5–6), synthesizer (1, 4, 6), piano (2, 5–6), masterer (3)
- Lauren Santi – writer (6)
- Mario Dragoi – writer (6)
- Nathan Feuerstein – producer, writer
- Nichol Eskridge – writer (6)
- Red Triangle Productions – vocal producer (5)
- Rick Parkhouse – recording engineer (5)

== Charts ==
Chart performance for Fear
Chart (2025)	Peak position
Austrian Albums (Ö3 Austria)	4
Belgian Albums (Ultratop Flanders)	8
Belgian Albums (Ultratop Wallonia)	92
Canadian Albums (Billboard)	9
Danish Albums (Hitlisten)	36
Dutch Albums (Album Top 100)	6
German Albums (Offizielle Top 100)	10
German Hip-Hop Albums (Offizielle Top 100)	2
Hungarian Albums (MAHASZ)	33
Irish Albums (Official Charts)	36
Lithuanian Albums (AGATA)	75
New Zealand Albums (RMNZ)	14
Norwegian Albums (IFPI Norge)	27
Polish Albums (ZPAV)	35
Scottish Albums (Official Charts)	9
Swedish Albums (Sverigetopplistan)	31
Swiss Albums (Schweizer Hitparade)	2
UK Albums (Official Charts)	14
UK Christian & Gospel Albums (Official Charts)	1
US Billboard 200	4
US Top R&B/Hip-Hop Albums (Billboard)	2

== Release history ==
Release history and formats for Fear
Region	Date	Format(s)	Label(s)	Ref.
Various	November 14, 2025	CD; LP; digital download; streaming	NF Real Music	
