= Fear (NF song) =

Song by NF

from the EP Fear
- Released: November 7, 2025
- Length: 4:29
- Label: NF; Capitol
- Songwriters: Nathan Feuerstein; Jeff Sojka
- Producers: Feuerstein; Sojka; Aaron Chafin

"Fear" is a song recorded by the American rapper NF. The song was released on November 14, 2025, via NF Real Music and Capitol Music Group, as the title track to his extended play of the same name (2025). "Fear" peaked at No. 53 on the Official Charts Company UK singles chart, No. 87 on the Irish Singles Chart, and No. 1 on the Recorded Music NZ New Zealand Hot Singles chart. The song was both written by Nathan Feuerstein and Jeff Sojka, with Feuerstein, Sojka, and Aaron Chafin producing.

== Writing and production ==
The lyrics to "Fear" describe NF questioning whether he has obsessive-compulsive disorder or schizophrenia. The song is composed using piano. The song was described by Music and Gigs to be "raw", "messy", and "intrusive thoughts turned into art", and comparing it the rest of NF's work, overall being "one of the most uncomfortably honest pieces he’s ever written".

"Fear" is composed in the key of G, with a speed of 188 beats per minute and a key signature of 3/4.

== Release and promotion ==
Upon the song's release, "Fear" was supported with a music video. Before the video's release, it was scheduled for premiere on YouTube. The video was described by Universal Music Canada to be "cinematic" with "intriguing imagery".

"Fear" was performed by U.S. Olympic figure skater Ilia Malinin during the 2026 Winter Olympics exhibition gala. The song, along with elements from Malinin's Olympic gala performance, was later released as an emote in the video game Fortnite in April 2026.

== Reception ==
Professional ratings
Review scores
| Source | Rating |
|---|---|
| RGM | 4/5 stars |

=== Commercial ===
On November 23, 2025, before its initial chart entry, "Fear" entered the OCC UK Singles Chart Update at No. 55. Within the song's first charting week of November 27, 2025, it debuted at No. 53 on the UK Singles Chart and No. 73 on the UK Video Streaming Chart. Additionally, the song led the Recorded Music NZ Hot Singles chart and hit No. 87 on the Irish Singles chart.

=== Accolades ===
| Year | Organization | Category | Result | Ref. |
|---|---|---|---|---|
| 2025 | We Love Awards | Mainstream Impact Award | Nominated | |

Year-end lists
| Publication | Accolade | Rank | Ref. |
|---|---|---|---|
| Jesus Freak Hideout | David Craft's Song Picks of 2025 | 3 | |
| Jesus Freak Hideout | Evan Dickens' Song Picks of 2025 | 4 | |
| Jesus Freak Hideout | Dave Trout's Song Picks of 2025 | 2 | |

== Personnel ==
Credits adapted from Tidal Music.

- Aaron Chafin – producer, programmer, engineer, guitar,
- Alex Dobbert – masterer
- Brad O'Donnell – artists and repertoire
- Jeff Sojka – producer, writer, programmer, bass, engineer, guitar, mixer, recording engineer, strings, synthesizer
- Nathan Feuerstein – producer, writer

== Charts ==
| Chart (2025–2026) | Peak position |
|---|---|
| Australia (ARIA) | 88 |
| Austria (Ö3 Austria Top 40) | 46 |
| Canada Hot 100 (Billboard) | 47 |
| Germany Airplay (BVMI) | 78 |
| Global 200 (Billboard) | 62 |
| Ireland (IRMA) | 87 |
| Netherlands (Single Top 100) | 44 |
| New Zealand Hot Singles (RMNZ) | 1 |
| Switzerland (Schweizer Hitparade) | 44 |
| UK Singles (Official Charts) | 53 |
| UK Christian Songs (Cross Rhythms) | 1 |
| US Billboard Hot 100 | 35 |
| US Hot R&B/Hip-Hop Songs (Billboard) | 6 |
