= Fleurie (musician) =

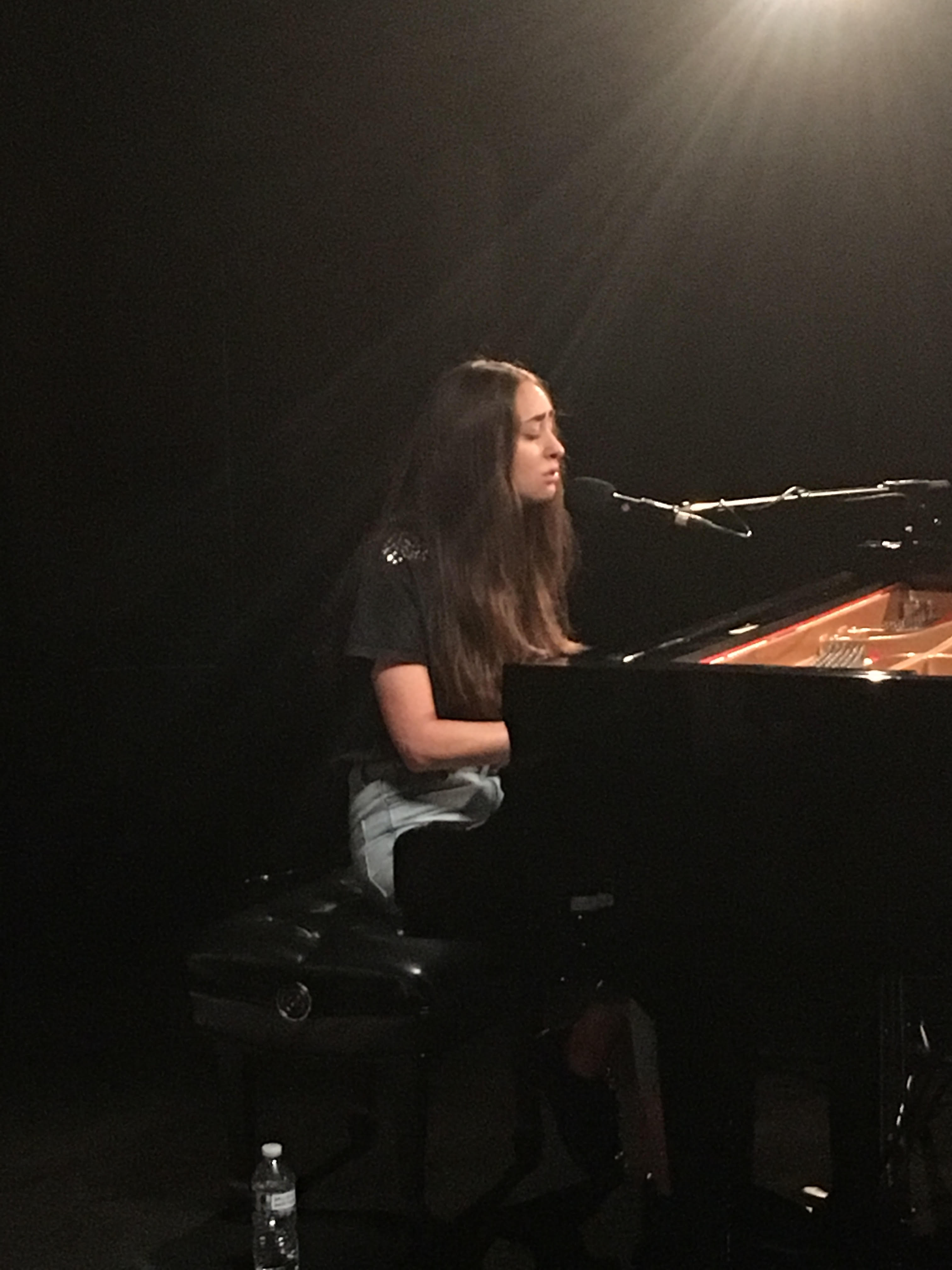
- Fleurie in her Nashville, TN Studio in 2018.

Background information
- Born: Lauren Elizabeth Strahm; October 10, 1990 (age 36); Canton, Michigan, U.S.
- Origin: Nashville, Tennessee
- Genres: Alternative pop; Folk
- Occupations: Singer-songwriter, record producer
- Years active: 2013–present
- Label: Independent
- Spouse: Jordan Sloat (m. 2023)
- Website: www.fleuriemusic.com

Lauren Sloat (born October 10, 1990), better known by her stage name Fleurie, is an American musician from Nashville, Tennessee. Her first album, Love and War, was released on September 19, 2016. Songs from the album have been featured in Atypical, Cloak & Dagger, Reign, Bones, Pretty Little Liars, Saving Hope, Queen Sugar, Scream, Shadowhunters, and Station 19, among others. Fleurie toured internationally including headline dates in China and support dates with Owl City in Japan and South Korea in November 2018.

== Early life ==
Strahm was born Lauren Elizabeth Strahm on October 10, 1990, in Canton, Michigan, which is a suburb of Detroit. She began writing songs at age 11 but did not share them with anyone until she was 17.

At age 21, she moved to Nashville after college to pursue music as a career.

== Career ==
At age 19, she released a Christian album under her birth name. In 2013 Strahm put out the first release under the Fleurie moniker, an EP entitled Fear and Fable. This was followed by the 2015 EP Arrows. Off of that album, "Still Your Girl" was selected by NPR for their Songs We Love series, a part of the All Songs Considered podcast. "Wildwood" was featured in Containment, Wynonna Earp, and Finding Carter, as well as "Sparks" being featured in Catfish: The TV Show.

In 2015 she collaborated with hip-hop artist NF on his song "Mansion" (which peaked at 30 on the Billboard Hot Christian Songs chart), the second track on his record of the same name which reached 62 on the Billboard 200. Fleurie later opened for NF on a US tour in 2016.

Her debut full-length Love and War was released on September 19, 2016. Songs "Breathe", "Love and War", "Soldier", "Turns You into Stone", and "Hurts Like Hell" have been featured in numerous TV shows including Outlander, Assassin's Creed, Pretty Little Liars, Finding Carter, Shadowhunters: The Mortal Instruments and The Originals, as well as the trailer for the twelfth and final season of Bones.

The song "Don't Let Me Down", off of her album Love and War was sampled by Kendrick Lamar on his song "Feel". This track appears on his 2017 album Damn

In 2018, she collaborated with producer Tommee Profitt and Mellen Gi on a cover of Linkin Park's 2001 single "In the End". As of December 2023, the video of the cover has over 1 billion views on YouTube.

In 2018, she collaborated with electronic pop artist Ruelle on her song "Carry You" which was used in Shadowhunters.

On August 17, 2018 Fleurie released her second full-length album, Portals. Her song, Out of the Blue was featured on S15 Premiere, E1 of Grey's Anatomy on September 27, 2018.

In 2019 Fleurie's song "Love and War" was featured as the theme song for the True Crime podcast "To Live and Die in LA". A cover was then used in Westworld in 2022, but it does not appear on the Season 4 OST.

On April 30, 2020, "Breathe" was remixed by the Riot Music Team for the official launch video of Riot Games's Legends of Runeterra.

On September 25, 2020, "Soldier" was used in the Disney+ original film, Secret Society of Second-Born Royals.

On November 12, 2020, "Hurricane" was used as theme song for the trailer of "Black Beauty" by Disney+.

Fleurie announced on June 1, 2021 on Instagram that she's opening for Colony House as part of a North American tour.

On June 16, 2023, Fleurie released her third full-length album, Supertropicali.

== Discography ==
List of Albums
Title	Album details
Fly (as Lauren Strahm)	Released: 2011 Format: CD/digital download Label: Independently released
Love and War	Released: 2016 Format: CD/Vinyl Record/digital download Label: Fleurieland Records
Portals	Released: 2018 Format: CD/Vinyl Record/digital download Label: Fleurieland Records
Supertropicali	Released: 2023 Format: CD/digital download Label: Fleurieland Records
Late But Blooming	Released: 2026 Format: CD/digital download Label: Fleurieland Records

List of EPs
Title	EP Details
Fear & Fable	Released: 2013 Format: digital download Label: Fleurieland Records
Arrows	Released: 2015 Format: digital download Label: Fleurieland Records
Portals: The B-Sides	Released: 2019 Format: digital download Label: Fleurieland Records
Greetings from Supertropicali (Chapter 1)	Released: 2022 Format: digital download Label: Fleurieland Records
It's Always Summer in Supertropicali (Chapter 2)	Released: 2022 Format: digital download Label: Fleurieland Records

List of singles as featured artist
Title	Year	Album
"Silent Night" (Tommee Profitt, ft Fleurie)	2020	The King is Born
"Carry You" (Ruelle ft. Fleurie)	2018	Non-album single
"In The End" [Mellen Gi & Tommee Profitt Remix] (feat. Fleurie) (Linkin Park Cover)	2018	Non-album single
"Be A Witness" (Unsecret ft. Fleurie)	2018	Vision – EP
"Wolves" (Three Kings$ ft. Ashilee Ashilee & Fleurie)	2017	One Crown 5
"King of Diamonds" (Horace Holloway ft. Fleurie)	2016	Tin Foil Stars – EP
"Crystalize" (Aron Wright ft. Fleurie)	2015	Non-album single
"Mansion" (NF ft. Fleurie)	2015	Mansion

== Personal life ==
On February 16, 2023, Fleurie announced her engagement to fellow musician, Jordan Sloat. They married on July 22, 2023 in Nashville, Tennessee.
