= Mansion (album) =

Studio album by NF
- Released: March 31, 2015
- Genre: Christian hip-hop
- Length: 48:08
- Label: Capitol CMG

NF chronology
NF (2014)	Mansion (2015)	Therapy Session (2016)

Singles from Mansion
- 1. "Intro" Released: March 17, 2015; 2. "Wait" Released: March 24, 2015; 3. "All I Have" Released: 2015

Mansion is the debut studio album by American rapper NF. It was released on March 31, 2015 through Capitol CMG and features appearances from singers Fleurie, Jeremiah Carlson and Britt Nicole. It reached number 62 on the US Billboard 200 and was certified gold by the Recording Industry Association of America.

== Critical reception ==
Professional ratings
Review scores
Source	Rating
AllMusic	4/5 stars
CCM Magazine	4/5 stars
Cross Rhythms	10/10 squares
Jesus Freak Hideout	5/5 stars

David Jeffries, giving the album four stars at AllMusic, writes, "the rapper deliver[s] the goods on this awesome debut." Signaling in a four-star review by CCM Magazine, Grace S. Aspinwall realizes, "Raw, gritty, and enigmatic, this project from the ultra-talented newcomer NF, is an impressive effort", and calls NF "an artist to watch, and brilliance is sure to follow this beautiful, sometimes dark, and vulnerable project." Specifying in a five-star review for Jesus Freak Hideout, Kevin Hoskins responds, "The only downfall here will be that some people aren't impressed by such raw, personal, and emotionally-driven rap, but that's exactly what makes this stand out among so many rap albums out today... This has 'album of the year' written all over it." Steve Hayes, delivering a ten-out-of-ten review at Cross Rhythms, regards this as, "unquestionably one of the finest ever to emerge from the gospel hip-hop scene."

== Commercial performance ==
Mansion debuted at No. 62 on the Billboard 200 selling 10,169 copies in the first week. By October 2017, the album had sold 136,000 copies in the United States.

== Track listing ==
No.	Title	Length
1.	"Intro"	3:20
2.	"Mansion" (featuring Fleurie)	5:24
3.	"All I Have"	4:09
4.	"Wait"	4:02
5.	"Wake Up"	3:53
6.	"Face It"	3:40
7.	"Motivated"	4:22
8.	"Notepad"	3:39
9.	"Turn the Music Up"	3:20
10.	"Paralyzed"	4:31
11.	"I'll Keep On" (featuring Jeremiah Carlson of The Neverclaim)	4:15
12.	"Can You Hold Me" (featuring Britt Nicole)	3:41
Total length:		48:08

== Charts ==
Chart (2015-2018)	Peak position
UK Christian & Gospel Albums (Official Charts)	1
US Billboard 200	62
US Top Christian Albums (Billboard)	1
US Top Rap Albums (Billboard)	9

== Certifications ==
Region	Certification	Certified units/sales
Canada (Music Canada)	Gold	40,000^{‡}
United States (RIAA)	Gold	500,000^{‡}
^{‡} Sales+streaming figures based on certification alone.
