= Perception (NF album) =

Studio album by NF
- Released: October 6, 2017
- Studios: BLRZ (Franklin, Tennessee); The Glove Box Studios (Nashville, Tennessee); Tommee Profitt Studios (Franklin, Tennessee); Tommee Profitt Studios (Grand Rapids, Michigan)
- Genre: Hip-hop
- Length: 61:38
- Labels: Capitol; Caroline; NF Real Music
- Producers: Tommee Profitt; David Garcia

NF chronology
Therapy Session (2016)	Perception (2017)	The Search (2019)

Singles from Perception
- 1. "Outro" Released: August 2, 2017; 2. "Green Lights" Released: August 18, 2017; 3. "Let You Down" Released: September 14, 2017; 4. "Lie" Released: April 17, 2018; 5. "If You Want Love" Released: January 22, 2019

Perception is the third studio album by American rapper NF. It was released on October 6, 2017, through Capitol Records alongside Caroline Records and NF's newly launched label NF Real Music. It was entirely produced by American producers Tommee Profitt and David Garcia, and features a guest performance from American singer Ruelle. The album is a departure from NF's Christian hip-hop style following his sophomore album Therapy Session in 2016, and is mainly focused on secular music.

Perception was preceded by the release of the singles including "Outro", "Green Lights", "Let You Down", "Lie", and "If You Want Love". The album charted at number one on the Billboard 200, and received generally positive reviews from music critics. It also reached the top ten in Denmark and Norway.

== Background and release ==
"Outro" was released on August 2, 2017, as the first single from a then unnamed upcoming album. Fans speculated that the album's title would be Perception based on information found in the "Green Lights" music video. Three days before the album's release, NF released the single "Let You Down", which would become his first song to chart on the Billboard Hot 100 chart. In an interview with Rap.de, NF explained the album was about his perception, though it could be "from anyone in the world".

== Critical reception ==
Professional ratings
Review scores
Source	Rating
AllMusic	3.5/5 stars
CCM Magazine	4/5 stars
Jesus Freak Hideout	2/5 stars 3.5/5 stars

CCM Magazine's Matt Conner gave the album 4 out of 5 stars, saying "The maturity and musical experimentation grows on Perception, yet the dynamism and authenticity remain firmly in place." David Craft of Jesus Freak Hideout gave the album a below-average review, awarding it two out of five stars due to a lack of originality and redundancy. He stated that "Perception essentially consists of NF spending an hour yelling at listeners about his thinly-veiled insecurities while simultaneously bragging about how great he is" and that there were a few "glimmers of quality", but that "NF exercises neither patience nor humility on Perception." Kevin Hoskins, also of Jesus Freak Hideout, gave a more positive "second opinion" review, giving it 3.5 out of 5 stars, saying the album's biggest flaw was that it is "very one-dimensional" but praised the album for its continuity of emotional lyrics and thematic production from NF's previous albums by saying "Perception does not offer fans anything exceptionally new, but current fans will truly appreciate the fire Nate spits on these highly emotional rap tunes. As always, the thematic production is easily noticed making this a complete NF album, even though it falls short of his previous discography."

Neil Z. Yeung of AllMusic gave the album 3.5 out of 5, describing the album as a "heavy and serious listen" and described NF's lyrics as "continually engrossing".

== Commercial performance ==
Perception debuted at No. 1 on the US Billboard 200 with 55,000 album-equivalent units, including 38,000 pure album sales in its first week, becoming both NF's first US top 10 and No. 1 album. In its second week, the album fell to No. 25 with 18,000 album-equivalent units of which 5,000 were in traditional album sales. On March 22, 2018, the album was certified gold by the Recording Industry Association of America (RIAA) for combined sales and album-equivalent units of over 500,000 units in the United States. On July 11, 2023, the album was certified two-times platinum by the RIAA for sales of over 2,000,000 units in the United States.

As of August 2019, the album has earned 1.1 million equivalent album units, with 160,000 coming from album sales.

== Track listing ==
All songs produced by Tommee Profitt and David Garcia. Credits adapted from Tidal.

No.	Title	Writer(s)	Length
1.	"Intro III"	Nathan Feuerstein; Tommee Profitt	4:28
2.	"Outcast"	Feuerstein; Profitt	5:25
3.	"10 Feet Down" (featuring Ruelle)	Feuerstein; Profitt; Elley Duhé; Devin Guisande; Kyle Guisande	3:37
4.	"Green Lights"	Feuerstein; Garcia; Profitt	3:01
5.	"Dreams"	Feuerstein; Profitt	3:41
6.	"Let You Down"	Feuerstein; Profitt	3:32
7.	"Destiny"	Feuerstein; Profitt; Cameron Doyle	3:59
8.	"My Life"	Feuerstein; Garcia	3:35
9.	"You're Special"	Feuerstein; Profitt	5:12
10.	"If You Want Love"	Feuerstein; Profitt	3:19
11.	"Remember This"	Feuerstein; Profitt	4:00
12.	"Know"	Feuerstein; Profitt	3:58
13.	"Lie"	Feuerstein; Profitt; Mike Elizondo, Jr.	3:29
14.	"3 A.M."	Feuerstein; Garcia	3:38
15.	"One Hundred"	Feuerstein; Garcia; Brendon Coe	3:12
16.	"Outro"	Feuerstein; Garcia; Profitt	3:32
Total length:			61:38

== Personnel ==
Credits adapted from Tidal.

Musicians

- NF – vocals, composer (all tracks)
- Brendon Coe – composer (track 15)
- Cameron Doyle – composer (track 7)
- Elley Duhé – composer (track 3)
- Mike Elizondo – composer (track 13)
- David Garcia – composer (tracks 4, 8, 14–16)
- Devin Guisande – composer (track 3)
- Kyle Guisande – composer (track 3)
- Tommee Profitt – composer (tracks 1–7, 9–13, 16)
- Ruelle – guest vocals (track 3)

Production

- Vinnie Alibrandi – post-producer
- Chris Athens – mastering (all tracks)
- Mike Bozzi – mastering (all tracks)
- David Garcia – producer (all tracks)
- Tommee Profitt – producer (all tracks)

Design

- NF – art direction
- Jon Taylor Sweet – photography
- Joshua Wurzelbacher – art direction, package design

== Charts ==
=== Weekly charts ===
Chart (2017–2020)	Peak position
Australian Albums (ARIA)	73
Belgian Albums (Ultratop Flanders)	89
Canadian Albums (Billboard)	14
Danish Albums (Hitlisten)	8
Dutch Albums (Album Top 100)	57
Finnish Albums (Suomen virallinen lista)	22
French Albums (SNEP)	159
Latvian Albums (LaIPA)	40
New Zealand Heatseeker Albums (RMNZ)	1
Norwegian Albums (VG-lista)	10
Swedish Albums (Sverigetopplistan)	22
US Billboard 200	1
US Independent Albums (Billboard)	1
US Top R&B/Hip-Hop Albums (Billboard)	1

=== Year-end charts ===
Chart (2017)	Position
US Top R&B/Hip-Hop Albums (Billboard)	81

Chart (2018)	Position
Belgian Albums (Ultratop Flanders)	200
Canadian Albums (Billboard)	33
Danish Albums (Hitlisten)	57
Swedish Albums (Sverigetopplistan)	72
US Billboard 200	40
US Top R&B/Hip-Hop Albums (Billboard)	23

Chart (2019)	Position
Danish Albums (Hitlisten)	98
US Billboard 200	88
US Top R&B/Hip-Hop Albums (Billboard)	76

Chart (2020)	Position
Belgian Albums (Ultratop Flanders)	137
Danish Albums (Hitlisten)	99
US Billboard 200	131

== Certifications ==
Region	Certification	Certified units/sales
Australia (ARIA)	Gold	35,000^{‡}
Canada (Music Canada)	2× Platinum	160,000^{‡}
Denmark (IFPI Danmark)	2× Platinum	40,000^{‡}
New Zealand (RMNZ)	2× Platinum	30,000^{‡}
Poland (ZPAV)	Gold	10,000^{‡}
Sweden (GLF)	2× Platinum	60,000^{‡}
United Kingdom (BPI)	Gold	100,000^{‡}
United States (RIAA)	2× Platinum	2,000,000^{‡}
^{‡} Sales+streaming figures based on certification alone.
