= Therapy Session =

Studio album by NF
- Released: April 22, 2016
- Genres: Hip-hop; Christian hip-hop
- Label: Capitol CMG
- Producers: David Garcia; Jarrod Ingram; Tommee Profitt

NF chronology
Mansion (2015)	Therapy Session (2016)	Perception (2017)

Singles from Therapy Session
- 1. "Intro 2" Released: March 25, 2016; 2. "I Just Wanna Know" Released: April 8, 2016; 3. "Real" Released: 2016

Therapy Session is the second studio album by American rapper NF. It was released on April 22, 2016, through Capitol Christian Music Group. The album reached number 12 on the US Billboard 200 and was certified platinum by the Recording Industry Association of America.

== Critical reception ==
Professional ratings
Review scores
Source	Rating
AllMusic	4/5 stars
CCM Magazine	4/5 stars
The Christian Beat	4.9/5
Highlight Magazine	4/5
Jesus Freak Hideout	3.5/5 stars 4.5/5 stars 4/5 stars
Reel Gospel	4.5/5

Indicating in a four-star review at CCM Magazine, Matt Conner writes, "fortunately NF digs deeper on an impressive second album." David Craft, allotting the album three and a half stars from Jesus Freak Hideout, believes, "In no way is NF lacking in talent or creativity, but he could afford to exercise a tad more patience. This album doesn't seem quite ready for release, evidenced by the short, one-year gap between Mansion and Therapy Session. Regardless, NF has blown past the sophomore slump, creating a project well worth listening to." Awarding the album four and a half stars at Jesus Freak Hideout, Kevin Hoskins writes, "Many are not going to like the pure raw emotions here, but I am a fan of someone who can offer something outside of the box and this fits that bill perfectly." Mark Rice, rating the album three and a half stars for Jesus Freak Hideout, states, "Personally, I'm ambivalent towards NF's approach, but it makes for a good, thoughtful, and memorable listen. I do hope. however, for NF's sake, that he experiences some personal growth before his next album so another dark excursion isn't necessary."

Giving the album four stars from Jesus Freak Hideout, Lucas Munachen describes, "Therapy Session, is a strong step forward and delves into even darker themes....Therapy Session may be one of the year's most memorable rap albums, but I have a feeling it only scratches the surface of NF's talent." Christopher Smith, allocating the album a four-star review for Jesus Freak Hideout, believes, "Therapy Session is a rewarding and refreshingly honest listen if you can embrace it" where " The solid bars, simplistic yet cinematic production, and honest songwriting make this a solid and memorable sophomore release." Haley Black, indicating in a four out of five review at Highlight Magazine, says, "He bellows powerfully, building momentum, projecting his path as a musician and reliving the judgments that his career is meaningless." Signaling in a 4.5 out of five review for Reel Gospel, Carlin Doyle states, "dark and intense, but real." Chris Major, rating the album a 4.9 out of five, writes, "Therapy Session addresses the grief, regret, and anger stockpiled in Mansion, hitting home with NF's intense lyrics and undisputed honesty."

David Jeffries of AllMusic gave the album 4 out of 5 stars, praising the album for its "theatrical production" and described the album as "chock-full of raw emotions and honesty".

== Commercial performance ==
Therapy Session debuted at number 12 on the Billboard 200 selling 29,184 album-equivalent units in the first week. It also charted at number 1 on the Christian Albums Chart and number 1 on the Rap Albums chart. As of October 2017, it sold 122,000 copies in the United States.

== Track listing ==
No.	Title	Writer(s)	Producer(s)	Length
1.	"Intro 2"	Nate Feuerstein; Thomas Profitt	Tommee Profitt	3:15
2.	"Therapy Session"	Feuerstein; Profitt	Tommee Profitt	5:31
3.	"I Just Wanna Know"	Feuerstein; Profitt	Tommee Profitt	3:46
4.	"How Could You Leave Us"	Feuerstein; Profitt	Tommee Profitt	5:22
5.	"Breathe"	Feuerstein; Profitt; Lauren Strahm	Tommee Profitt	4:19
6.	"Real"	Feuerstein; David Garcia	Garcia	4:23
7.	"Oh Lord"	Feuerstein; Garcia	Garcia	3:18
8.	"I Can Feel It"	Feuerstein; Profitt	Tommee Profitt	3:53
9.	"Got You on My Mind"	Feuerstein; Garcia	Garcia	4:01
10.	"Grindin'" (featuring Marty of Social Club)	Feuerstein; Profitt; Marty Santiago	Tommee Profitt	4:37
11.	"Wish You Wouldn't"	Feuerstein; Jarrod Ingram	Ingram	4:46
12.	"Statement"	Feuerstein; Garcia; Ingram	Garcia; Ingram	3:10
13.	"All I Do"	Feuerstein; Garcia	Garcia	3:48
14.	"Lost in the Moment" (featuring Jonathan Thulin)	Feuerstein; Profitt; Jonathan Thulin	Tommee Profitt	4:02
Total length:				58:11

== Awards and nominations ==
GMA Dove Awards

Year	Award	Result
2016	Best Rap/Hip Hop Album of the Year	Won

== Charts ==
Chart (2016)	Peak position
Canadian Albums (Billboard)	43
US Billboard 200	12
US Top Christian Albums (Billboard)	1
US Top Rap Albums (Billboard)	1

== Certifications ==
Region	Certification	Certified units/sales
Canada (Music Canada)	Gold	40,000^{‡}
United Kingdom (BPI)	Silver	60,000^{‡}
United States (RIAA)	Platinum	1,000,000^{‡}
^{‡} Sales+streaming figures based on certification alone.
