= No Name (NF song) =

Single by NF
- Released: January 19, 2018
- Recorded: 2018
- Genre: Hip-hop
- Length: 3:04
- Label: Capitol; Caroline; NF Real Music LLC
- Songwriters: Nathan Feuerstein; Tommee Profitt; Cameron Doyle; Stephanie Wachman
- Producers: Nathan Feuerstein; Tommee Profitt

NF singles chronology
"Let You Down" (2017)	"No Name" (2018)	"Lie" (2018)

Music video
- "No Name" on YouTube

"No Name" (stylized as "NO NAME") is a song by American rapper NF. It was released as a single on January 19, 2018.

== Background ==
NF raps about his growth as an artist, dealing with fame and his new found success.

Feuerstein dedicated the song to his come up from his worldwide hit, Let You Down. He discussed his success in an interview with New Musical Express:

"Honestly, for me I think it's just being myself and being authentic. I think when people listen to music they can truly feel authenticity. For me personally, as a listener, there are certain songs where I'm just like: man, I know that person was really feeling that... And so what I've realized is I just went in writing and being myself, and then there are so many people out there who feel like me and want to say the things that I have to say but maybe don't know how to say them. And I just feel like just how some artists have been a voice to me, I've kind of been a voice for other people."

== Music video ==
The official music video was released on January 18, 2018, on NF's Vevo channel. The video showcases NF rapping in a dark alleyway.

== Track listing ==
No.	Title	Writer(s)	Producer(s)	Length
1.	"No Name"	Nathan Feuerstein Stephanie Wachman	Nathan Feuerstein; Tommee Profitt	3:04

== Charts ==
Chart (2018)	Peak position
US Billboard Hot 100	82
US Hot R&B/Hip-Hop Songs (Billboard)	35

== Certifications ==
Region	Certification	Certified units/sales
Australia (ARIA)	Gold	35,000^{‡}
United States (RIAA)	Gold	500,000^{‡}
^{‡} Sales+streaming figures based on certification alone.
