= The Neverclaim =

- Origin: Portland, Oregon, U.S.
- Genres: CCM, Christian rock, pop rock
- Years active: 2007–present
- Labels: Essential
- Members: Jeremiah Carlson, Mitchell Maldonado, Chuck Hill, Beji George,
- Website: theneverclaim.com

The Neverclaim is a contemporary Christian music band from Portland, Oregon. They are on the Essential Records label, which they released their first studio album on September 24, 2013, entitled The Neverclaim. Their second album, The Joy, was released from The Fuel Music in association with Radiate Music, in 2015.

== Background ==
The Neverclaim are from Portland, Oregon and Houston, Texas, but their home church is The Vineyard in Vancouver, Washington. The quartet claim as influences to their musical style the likes of Third Day, Kevin Prosch, Rich Mullins, Bruce Springsteen, Keith Green, Hall and Oates, The Decemberists, Foo Fighters, Keith Urban and Vineyard Worship. Also, The Neverclaim have been compared to such acts as Copeland, Coldplay, Anberlin and Radiohead. They have been noted for having a sound in their music and vocal that is similar to Needtobreathe, Third Day, NewSong, while having lyrics like One Sonic Society and All Sons & Daughters. The Neverclaim credits John Wimber, Charles Spurgeon, Ravi Zacharias, Alistair Begg, Chuck Swindoll, John Piper, Robby Dawkins, Todd White and Phil Strout as their influences on their life and ministry. Lastly, Mac Powell was the person responsible for introducing them to their label Essential Records.

== Music ==
In August 2013, the band were signed to Essential Records, which is a major Christian music label in the United States.

=== Independent albums ===
The Neverclaim released three independent albums starting with 2007's I Became Low on Break of Day, 2010's Quietdown on Come&Live! and 2012's Revival with Vineyard Worship and Come&Live! labels.

=== The Neverclaim ===
On September 24, 2013, The Neverclaim released their eponymously entitled The Neverclaim album that charted at No. 47 the Top Heatseekers Albums chart, for the Billboard charting week of October 12, 2013. In addition, the Billboard charting week of October 19, 2013 saw the album chart at No. 48 on the Top Christian Albums chart, and the album rose on the Top Heatseekers Albums chart to the No. 34 placement.

== The Joy ==
Their second album, The Joy, was released on July 17, 2015, with The Fuel Music in tandem with Radiate Music, and produced by Ian Eskelin.

== Members ==
- Jeremiah Carlson – lead vocals, acoustic guitar
- Mitchell Maldonado – guitar, keys, backing vocals, banjo
- Chuck Hill – bass guitar and upright bass guitar
- Beji George - drums, synth, percussion

== Discography ==
=== Independent Albums ===
Title	Album details
I Became Low	Released: July 31, 2007; CD; Label: Break of Day
Quiet Down	Released: July 1, 2010; CD; Label: Come&Live!
Revival	Released: May 4, 2012; CD, Digital Download; Label: Come&Live!

=== Studio albums ===
List of studio albums, with selected chart positions
Title	Album details	Peak chart positions	
Title	Album details	US Christ	US Heat
The Neverclaim	Released: September 24, 2013; Label: Essential; CD, digital download	48	34
