= Let You Down (NF song) =

Single by NF

from the album Perception
- Released: September 14, 2017
- Genre: Hip-hop; pop rap
- Length: 3:32
- Label: Capitol; Caroline; NF Real Music LLC
- Songwriters: Nate Feuerstein; Tommee Profitt
- Producers: David Garcia; Profitt

NF singles chronology
"Green Lights" (2017)	"Let You Down" (2017)	"No Name" (2018)

Music video
- "Let You Down" on YouTube

"Let You Down" is a song by American rapper and songwriter NF. It serves as the third single from his third studio album, Perception, released on September 14, 2017. It reached the top ten in Australia, Denmark, Finland, Germany, Ireland, New Zealand, Norway, Sweden and the United Kingdom. It is also NF's highest-charting song to date, peaking at No. 12 on the Billboard Hot 100.

"Let You Down" also charted on Billboard's Hot Christian Songs and Hot Rhythmic Songs, reaching the No. 1 spot on the former chart. It is his first song to be certified gold by the Recording Industry Association of America. It was later certified 8× platinum in the US, and also reached multi-platinum in several other countries, including Canada and Australia.

== Song history ==
"Let You Down" was produced by David Garcia and Tommee Profitt. NF wrote the song about his relationship with his father and how he did not want to disappoint him, making it the first time he had publicly spoken about his relationship with his father, who raised him as a child. His parents went through a divorce, and his mother overdosed years later.

== Music video ==
The official music video was released on November 9, 2017, on NF's Vevo channel.

The music video was directed and produced by Nathan Feuerstein (NF's real name) and Patrick Tohill. Given the song's lyrical content, the visual focus is on the relationship between an older Nate and his younger self. The clip shows an older man, presumably his future self, standing on a dock looking at a lake, while a fully clothed NF drowns right in front of him. As he flails and tries to keep from going under, the man just looks at him, and doesn't help. Then, the same man is seen staring at NF who is trapped in a burning car. As it's engulfed in flames, the man again makes no move to help. Then we see the older man in a field, staring into a freshly dug grave. Inside the grave is a coffin, and NF is inside, dead. The older man seems upset by this, and falls to his knees. In the final shot, the older man is back on the dock, looking at NF drowning once again. The camera switches views to an identical tattoo that NF has. Then a woman (played by Casey Zeller) approaches him on the dock and says, "Nathan?"

== Chart performance ==
"Let You Down" reached No. 1 on the Hot Christian Songs and Mainstream Top 40 charts. It also reached No. 12 on the US Billboard Hot 100, NF's first entry on the chart. The song achieved international success, charting in the UK, Australia, Belgium, Canada, Norway, the Netherlands, Sweden, Switzerland, New Zealand and Ireland.

== Charts ==
=== Weekly charts ===
Chart (2017–18)	Peak position
Australia (ARIA)	7
Austria (Ö3 Austria Top 40)	11
Belgium (Ultratop 50 Flanders)	15
Belgium (Ultratop 50 Wallonia)	31
Canada Hot 100 (Billboard)	15
Czech Republic Airplay (ČNS IFPI)	12
Czech Republic Singles Digital (ČNS IFPI)	12
Denmark (Tracklisten)	7
Finland (Suomen virallinen lista)	6
Germany (GfK)	9
Hungary (Stream Top 40)	11
Ireland (IRMA)	4
Italy (FIMI)	44
Latvia (DigiTop100)	8
Malaysia (RIM)	17
Netherlands (Single Top 100)	18
New Zealand (Recorded Music NZ)	7
Norway (VG-lista)	2
Philippines (Philippine Hot 100)	52
Poland Airplay (ZPAV)	52
Portugal (AFP)	19
Scotland Singles (Official Charts)	14
Slovakia Singles Digital (ČNS IFPI)	16
Sweden (Sverigetopplistan)	2
Switzerland (Schweizer Hitparade)	16
UK Singles (Official Charts)	6
US Billboard Hot 100	12
US Adult Pop Airplay (Billboard)	25
US Dance Airplay (Billboard)	4
US Hot Christian Songs (Billboard)	1
US Hot R&B/Hip-Hop Songs (Billboard)	6
US Pop Airplay (Billboard)	1
US Rhythmic Airplay (Billboard)	2

=== Year-end charts ===
Chart (2017)	Position
Hungary (Stream Top 40)	61
Sweden (Sverigetopplistan)	68
US Christian Songs (Billboard)	61
Chart (2018)	Position
Australia (ARIA)	37
Belgium (Ultratop Flanders)	95
Canada (Canadian Hot 100)	37
Denmark (Tracklisten)	96
Estonia (IFPI)	42
Germany (Official German Charts)	64
Iceland (Plötutíóindi)	38
Sweden (Sverigetopplistan)	68
Switzerland (Schweizer Hitparade)	57
UK Singles (Official Charts Company)	66
UK Cross Rhythms Annual Chart	28
US Billboard Hot 100	29
US Dance/Mix Show Airplay (Billboard)	21
US Hot R&B/Hip-Hop Songs (Billboard)	17
US Mainstream Top 40 (Billboard)	15
US Rhythmic (Billboard)	13

== Certifications ==
Region	Certification	Certified units/sales
Australia (ARIA)	10× Platinum	700,000^{‡}
Belgium (BRMA)	Gold	10,000^{‡}
Brazil (Pro-Música Brasil)	Platinum	40,000^{‡}
Canada (Music Canada)	9× Platinum	720,000^{‡}
Denmark (IFPI Danmark)	2× Platinum	180,000^{‡}
France (SNEP)	Platinum	200,000^{‡}
Germany (BVMI)	3× Gold	900,000^{‡}
Italy (FIMI)	Platinum	50,000^{‡}
Mexico (AMPROFON)	Gold	30,000^{‡}
New Zealand (RMNZ)	5× Platinum	150,000^{‡}
Poland (ZPAV)	Platinum	50,000^{‡}
Portugal (AFP)	Gold	5,000^{‡}
Spain (Promusicae)	Gold	30,000^{‡}
United Kingdom (BPI)	3× Platinum	1,800,000^{‡}
United States (RIAA)	8× Platinum	8,000,000^{‡}
Streaming
Sweden (GLF)	4× Platinum	32,000,000^{†}
^{‡} Sales+streaming figures based on certification alone.^{†} Streaming-only figures based on certification alone.

== Release history ==
Region	Date	Format	Label	Ref.
United States	September 14, 2017	Digital download	Capitol CMG; NF Real Music LLC	
United States	October 3, 2017	Rhythmic contemporary radio	Caroline	
United States	October 24, 2017	Contemporary hit radio	Caroline	

== See also ==
- List of best-selling singles in the United States
- List of highest-certified singles in Australia
