= NF (rapper) =

American rapper and musician (born 1991)

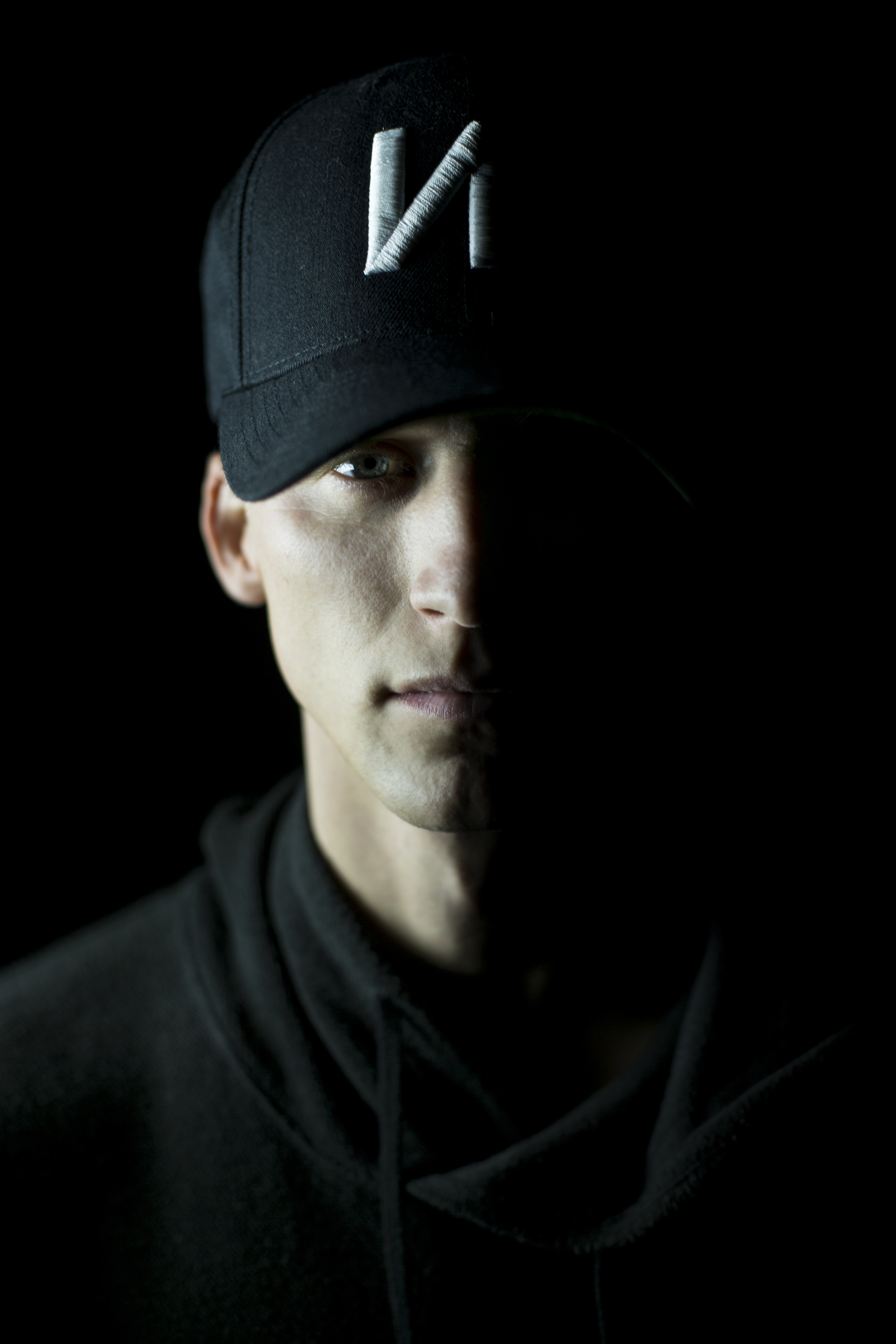
- NF in 2016
- Born: Nathan John Feuerstein; March 30, 1991 (age 35); Gladwin, Michigan, U.S.
- Occupations: Rapper; singer; songwriter; record producer
- Years active: 2010–present
- Spouse: Bridgette Doremus (m. 2018)
- Children: 2
- Awards: Awards and nominations
- Musical career
- Genre: Hip-hop
- Instruments: Vocals
- Labels: Capitol; Capitol CMG; Caroline; Virgin; Xist; NF Real Music
- Website: nfrealmusic.com

Nathan John Feuerstein (born March 30, 1991), known professionally as NF (stylized as ИF), is an American rapper, singer, songwriter, and record producer. Rooted in Christian hip-hop, he has released three EPs, I'm Free (2012), a self-titled EP in 2014 with Capitol CMG, and Fear in 2025 with NF Real Music and Capitol Records. His second and first major-label studio album, Mansion, was released on March 31, 2015. His third studio album, Therapy Session, was released on April 22, 2016, and peaked at number 12 on the US Billboard 200. His albums have earned several accolades, some of which include the Gospel Music Association Dove Award for Rap/Hip Hop Album of the Year (Therapy Session) in 2016 and the Rap/Hip Hop Recorded Song of the Year ("Oh Lord") in 2017.

NF achieved mainstream popularity in 2017 with Perception; the album charted at number one in the United States and was certified platinum, while its third single, "Let You Down", reached number twelve on the U.S. Billboard Hot 100, and was a top-five hit internationally. He achieved similar commercial success with his follow up The Search (2019). Clouds was released in 2021. Feuerstein's most recent studio album, Hope, released on April 7, 2023, also had commercial success and peaked at number 2 on the US Billboard 200. His third EP, and most recent project, Fear, was released on November 14, 2025.

== Early life ==
Nathan John Feuerstein was born in Gladwin, Michigan, on March 30, 1991. He is the eldest of three and has two sisters. His parents divorced, and he was raised by his mother who was an opioid addict. Eventually his father took custody of him after his mother's boyfriend physically abused him and one of his sisters. To cope with his tumultuous childhood, Feuerstein used music as an escape. He started off by listening to music and then eventually began making music of his own. He would spend hours inside of his parents' van writing. He would also record songs on a karaoke machine, recording instrumentals on one microphone and his rhymes on the other. Feuerstein's mother died from an overdose of opioids in 2009, which led to him dedicating the song "How Could You Leave Us" to her. He graduated from Gladwin High School in 2009, and was on the school's basketball team.

== Career ==
=== 2008-2014: Fine Arts Festival, Moments, I'm Free, NF ===
As a high school student, Feuerstein participated in the Fine Arts Festival, which was organized by Connection Church in Canton Michigan. He placed first in the rap category in Michigan in 2008 and placed second nationwide in 2009.

On November 29, 2010, Feuerstein independently released his debut studio album Moments under his real name. On August 2, 2011, he released his debut single "Alone". The song featured songwriter and producer Tommee Profitt and Brooke Griffith. Feuerstein's work attracted the attention of the Christian record label, Xist Music and in March of 2012, they announced that he had signed with them. On May 2, 2012, he released his debut extended play I'm Free with production work from Profitt. The track list consisted of nine songs including "Alone". The EP also included an exclusive version of "Alone" featuring Sean Simmonds.

Xist teased for the release of the self-titled extended play NF, but Feuerstein parted ways with the label after a dispute and the production of NF was postponed. Despite this, his song, "Only One", featuring Shuree Williams, was featured in the label's compilation album, Move Vol 1. In 2013, Feuerstein appeared on Christian hip-hop artist Flame's album Royal Flush on the track "Start Over". He released a single, "Beautiful Addiction", on November 4, 2013. The song again featured an appearance from Profitt, as well as vocals from Brady Schmitz and Danielle Swift.

In May of 2014 Feuerstein announced that he had signed with Capitol Christian Music Group. On August 5, 2014, he released his self-titled EP, which was produced by Tomee Profitt. This EP was his breakthrough release on the Billboard, as it charted on the Christian Albums chart at No. 12, on the Top Gospel Albums at No. 4, and on the Top Rap Albums at No. 15. This extended play was reviewed by Jesus Freak Hideout and New Release Tuesday, receiving two three-and-a-half-star reviews. CCM Magazine reviewed the EP and awarded it four stars. "Wake Up" which was the second track on the EP, was featured in a commercial for the NBC Show Chicago P.D. in August of 2014. Another song from the EP titled "Hands Up" was featured on another NBCca show called Grimm.

=== 2015-2016: Mansion, Therapy Session ===
Feuerstein's first studio album, Mansion, was released on March 31, 2015, by Capitol CMG and featured a re-release of the song "Wake Up". "Turn the Music Up", which was one of the songs featured on the album, was played by ESPN during the 2015 NFL Draft. ESPN also played the song "Wake Up" for Monday night basketball. The song "Intro" which was the lead single from Mansion is included in the 2015 video game Madden NFL 16. It was also featured in the season finale trailer of the Fox channel show Empire. The music video for the song premiered on MTV.com's homepage. The video has also appeared on MTVU, AbsolutePunk, 2DOPEBOYZ, Raps & Hustles and The College Dropouts. In January of 2016, the Album's title track was featured on an episode of the NBC show Shades of Blue.

In 2015, his features on TobyMac's This Is Not a Test track "Til the Day I Die" and Marty's Marty For President track "The One With My Friends" gained him fame and recognition in the Christian hip-hop genre.

Feuerstein released the song "I Just Wanna Know" on April 8, 2016, and then two weeks later released the song "Real". The two singles were featured on his second studio album Therapy Session, which was released on April 22, 2016. Therapy Session won Rap/Hip Hop album of the year at the 2016 Dove Awards, while the single "I just wanna know", was nominated for Rap/Hip Hop recorded song of the year but did not win. Another song from Therapy Session called "Oh Lord" won a Dove Award for Rap/Hip Hop song of the year in 2017.

"Warm Up" was released as a non-album single on September 8, 2016.

=== 2017-2019: Perception, The Search ===
In 2017, Feuerstein collaborated with rapper Futuristic on the song "Epiphany", which enhanced his career in the secular hip-hop industry.

On October 6, 2017, Feuerstein released his third studio album, Perception. The album debuted at No. 1 on the Billboard 200, making it his first chart-topping album and the second artist in 2017 to release a No. 1 album without having charted on the Hot 100. The next week, "Let You Down" became his first single to chart on the Hot 100, debuting at 87. It became a sleeper hit, taking 17 weeks to reach its peak at No. 12. The song was nominated for a Teen Choice Award in the R&B/Hip Hop category but lost. It would go on to become certified platinum—selling over 1,000,000 units—by the RIAA on January 11, 2019. His song "Destiny", from Perception, is included in the video game MLB The Show 18.

Following the success of Perception, he announced he would begin touring mid-2018 with rappers Logic and Kyle.

In 2018, Feuerstein released the non-album single "No Name" on January 19. Later, he would release the song "Why", the first single preceding his fourth studio album. On May 30, 2019, he released "The Search", the album's title track. He would later release two more singles, "When I Grow Up" on June 27 and "Time" on July 12. The Search was released on July 26, 2019.

On December 3, 2019, Feuerstein released the single "Paid My Dues", as well as a music video for the song, which would later be included in his mixtape "Clouds".

=== 2020-2025: Clouds, Hope, Fear ===
In October 2020, Feuerstein returned with the non-album single "Chasing_(Demo)", after sharing a snippet of it online. The song features vocals by then 15-year-old Australian fan Mikayla Sippel, who uploaded a cover of it, which inspired NF to officially release the song after being "blown away" by her version.

On February 18, 2021, Feuerstein released the single "Clouds", alongside a music video, and announced his mixtape of the same name, which was scheduled for a March 26, 2021, release. The mixtape included "Paid My Dues", as well as guest appearances from rappers Hopsin and Tech N9ne, followed by a third single, "Lost" featuring Hopsin, released on March 11, 2021. On March 26, 2021, Clouds (The Mixtape) was released. A song from the mixtape called "LAYERS" was featured on the VH1 show Black Ink Crew: Chicago.

After a year-long absence from music, Feuerstein released a single "Hope" on February 16, 2023, announcing his fifth studio album of the same name. He released another single entitled "Motto" on March 9, 2023. Hope was released on April 7, 2023, along with the music video for the single "Happy".

On October 30, 2025, after a two-year hiatus, Feuerstein announced his third extended play, Fear, which released on November 14, 2025. The release included music videos for the songs "Fear" and "Washed Up", along with collaborations with MGK and James Arthur. In February of 2026, US Olympic figure skater Ilia Malanin performed a routine using the song "Fear".

== Artistry ==
Feuerstein has credited Eminem as his prime influence in hip-hop, claiming that at one point that was all he listened to. Feuerstein has also credited Adele and Ed Sheeran as influences to his music style and instrumental components. NF's style has also been compared to Logic and MGK. Although he found his musical upbringing in Christian hip-hop, Feuerstein has denied the label of Christian rapper, saying "I'm a Christian, but I don't make Christian music. You're not going to reach everyone with just one point of view. I write about things I'm actually dealing with. You don't have to be Christian to relate to them."

== Tours ==
- The Drop Tour (2015)
- Therapy Session Tour (2016–17)
- Perception Tour (2018)
- Perception World Tour (2018)
- The Search Tour (2019)
- Clouds Tour (2021)
- Hope Tour (2023–24)

== Personal life ==
=== Family and relationships ===
Feuerstein began dating Bridgette Doremus in 2015. They married in September 2018 after three years of dating. Their first child, a son, was born in August 2021. Their second child, a daughter, was born in December 2023.

=== Mental health ===
Feuerstein was diagnosed with obsessive–compulsive disorder (OCD) after the Perception tour in 2018. Following the tour, he revealed that he was struggling with his mental health and admitted himself into therapy, where he received the diagnosis. Feuerstein also has a history with depression and anxiety. He has frequently addressed these topics in his music, drawing from personal experiences to inform his lyrics. In discussing his 2023 album, Hope, Feuerstein stated that his OCD contributed to a prolonged creative process, with the album taking over a year and a half to complete. He described becoming fixated on the music, which made it difficult to produce songs he was satisfied with. To address these challenges, he began working with a therapist specializing in OCD.

== Discography ==
- Moments (2010) (Note: Released under his original name "Nathan Feuerstein".)
- Mansion (2015)
- Therapy Session (2016)
- Perception (2017)
- The Search (2019)
- Hope (2023)

== Awards and nominations ==
Year	Organization	Nominee	Award	Result	Ref.
2016	GMA Dove Awards	"I Just Wanna Know"	Rap/Hip Hop Recorded Song of the Year	Nominated	
2016	GMA Dove Awards	Therapy Session	Rap/Hip Hop Album of the Year	Won	
2017	GMA Dove Awards	"Oh Lord"	Rap/Hip Hop Recorded Song of the Year	Won	
2018	iHeartRadio Titanium Awards	"Let You Down"	1 Billion Total Audience Spins on iHeartRadio Stations	Won	
2019	iHeartRadio Music Awards	Himself	Best New Pop Artist	Nominated	
2025	We Love Awards	"Fear"	Mainstream Impact Award	Nominated	
