= Tommee Profitt =

American songwriter and producer (born 1984)

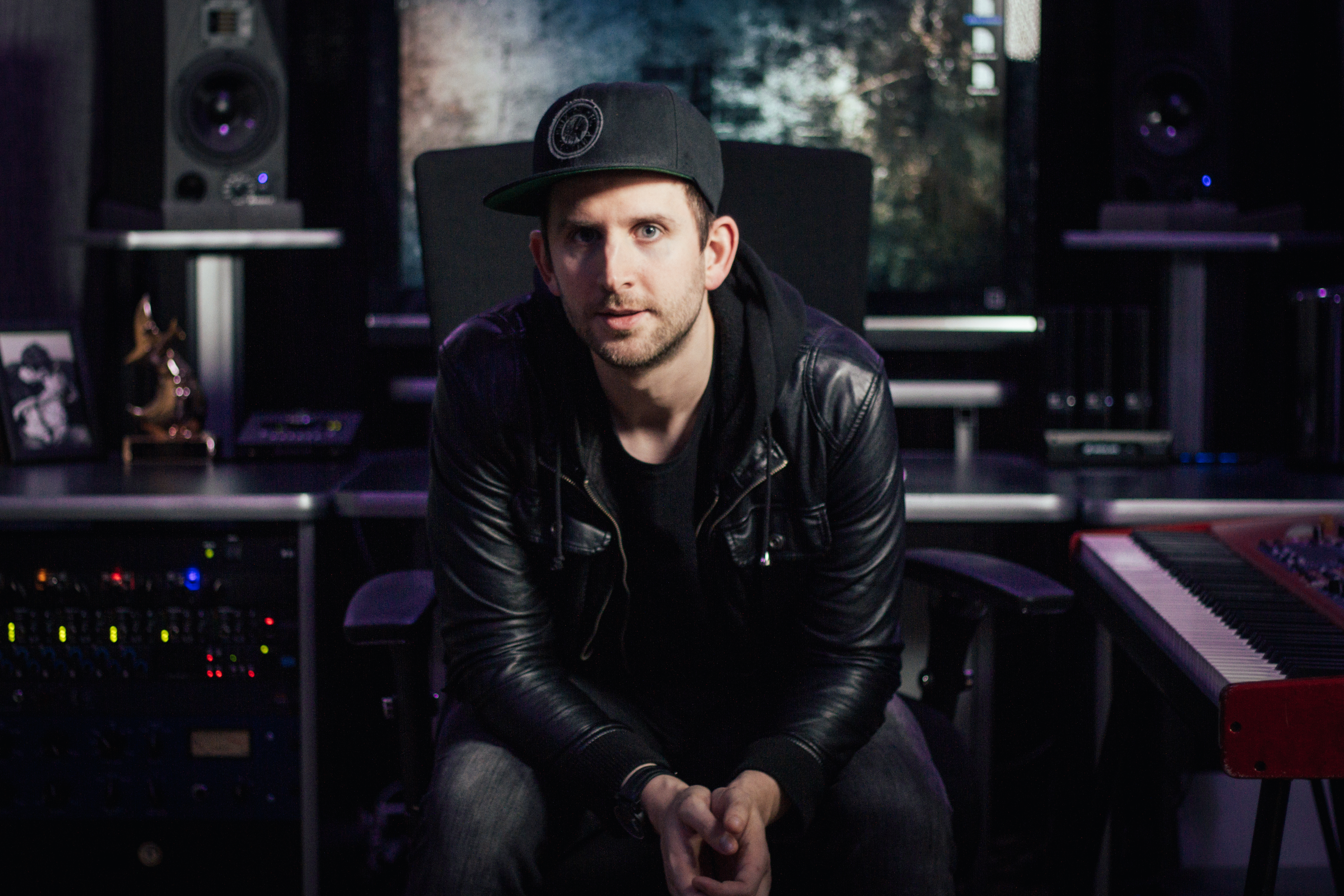
- Profitt at his home studio in 2018

Background information
- Born: Thomas James Profitt; November 12, 1984 (age 42); Grand Rapids, Michigan, United States
- Genres: CCM; pop; hip hop; soundtrack
- Occupations: Songwriter; record producer; multi-instrumentalist
- Label: Capitol CMG
- Spouse: Angela Profitt (m. 2008)
- Website: tommeeprofitt.com
- Children: 3

Tommee James Profitt (born November 12, 1984) is an American songwriter and record producer.

== Biography ==
Profitt is originally from Grand Rapids, Michigan, United States. He moved to Nashville, Tennessee in 2017 to continue his music career. He has worked on the production and sound development of rapper NF. More recently, he has also worked in film and television music. He has won two Dove Awards and has been nominated for five.

Profitt's music has been used for video game promos and scores including Ghost Recon Breakpoint, Apex Legends, Assassin's Creed, UFC2, and Madden.

In 2018, Profitt held the Top TV Song for two consecutive weeks with covers of Linkin Park's "In The End", featuring singer-songwriter Fleurie and American rapper Jung Youth. Another collaboration, "Wake Me Up", featuring Fleurie, charted on iTunes Top 50 and on Spotify's Top 50 Viral chart.

== Collaborations ==
Profitt is known for his production work with American rapper NF. The two met in Michigan while NF was starting out as a rapper and Profitt was transitioning from being a full-time artist to a producer. Profitt signed a publishing deal with Capitol CMG Publishing in 2014, the same year that NF signed with Capitol Christian Music Group as an artist. They have continued to be frequent collaborators, with Profitt collaborating on the writing and production on NF's four full-length releases that have been released under Capitol CMG.

The first album, Mansion, debuted at No. 1 on the Billboard Christian Albums chart and peaked at No. 62 on the Billboard 200 Albums chart. The second album, Therapy Session, also debuted at No. 1 on the Christian Albums Chart and peaked at No. 12 on the Billboard 200. NF's third studio album, Perception, debuted at No. 1 overall on the Billboard 200; his fourth studio album, The Search, did so too. With over one billion global streams, their song, “Let You Down,” claimed the No. 1 spot on the Billboard Pop Chart and went on to become an 8x RIAA Certified Platinum single. In addition to his work with NF, Tommee has worked with Hunter Hayes, Migos, The Score, Avril Lavigne, Social Club Misfits, Angie Rose, TobyMac, Chris Tomlin, Crowder, Britt Nicole, SVRCINA, Colton Dixon, Josh Groban, Nicole Nordeman, Blanca, Ruelle, Jung Youth, Fleurie, and others.

=== Cinematic Songs collection ===
Profitt's releases include eight Cinematic Songs volumes compiling his collaborations with other artists in film and television, as well as Gloria Regali, his most recent sync-focused collaboration with Fleurie.

== Personal life ==
Profitt began dating a woman named Angela on September 27, 2001. They married on September 27, 2008. As of 2022, they have three children, two of whom are named McKenlee and Colton. Profitt is a Christian. He and his family used to live in Grand Rapids, Michigan. He moved to Nashville, Tennessee in 2017, and as of 2021 he still resides there.

== Discography ==
=== Studio albums ===
Title	Details
Human	Released: August 14, 2026; Label: Independent; Format: Digital download, streaming

=== Cover albums ===
Title	Details
Cinematic Songs (Vol. 1)	Released: January 13, 2017; Label: Independent; Format: Digital download, streaming
Cinematic Songs (Vol. 2)	Released: April 14, 2017; Label: Independent; Format: Digital download, streaming
Cinematic Songs (Vol. 3)	Released: February 9. 2018; Label: Independent; Format: Digital download, streaming
Cinematic Songs (Vol. 4)	Released: July 4, 2018; Label: Independent; Format: Digital download, streaming
Cinematic Songs (Vol. 5)	Released: November 2, 2018; Label: Independent; Format: Digital download, streaming
Cinematic Songs (Vol. 6)	Released: August 23, 2019; Label: Independent; Format: Digital download, streaming
Covers (Vol. 1)	Released: May 1, 2020; Label: Independent; Format: Digital download, streaming
Cinematic Songs (Vol. 7)	Released: June 18, 2021; Label: Independent; Format: Digital download, streaming
Cinematic Songs (Vol. 8)	Released: September 15, 2022; Label: Independent; Format: Digital download, streaming
Covers (Vol. 2)	Released: May 10, 2024; Label: Independent; Format: Digital download, streaming
Cinematic Songs (Vol. 9)	Released: October 10, 2025; Label: Independent; Format: Digital download, streaming

=== Collaborative albums ===
Title	Details
Gloria Regali (with Fleurie)	Released: April 12, 2019; Label: Independent; Format: Digital download, streaming
The Fall (with Sam Tinnesz)	Released: April 11, 2025; Label: Independent; Format: Digital download, streaming

=== Holiday albums ===
Title	Details	Peak chart positions		
Title	Details	US Holiday	US Christ	UK G&G
The Birth of a King	Released: October 16, 2020; Label: Capitol CMG; Format: CD, digital download, streaming	28	26	—
The Resurrection of a King	Released: March 27, 2026; Label: Capitol CMG; Format: CD, digital download, streaming	—	11	19
"—" denotes a recording that did not chart or was not released in that territory.

=== Live albums ===
Title	Details	Peak chart positions
Title	Details	US Christ
The Birth of a King (Live)	Released: December 8, 2023; Label: Independent; Format: CD, LP, BR, digital download, streaming	45

=== Charted and certified singles ===
Title	Year	Peak chart positions				Certifications	Album
Title	Year	US Christ	US Christ Air	US Christ AC	US Christ Digital	Certifications	Album
"In the End" (feauring Fleurie and Jung Youth)	2019	—	—	—	—	RIAA: Gold; RMNZ: Gold	Covers (Vol. 1)
"O Holy Night" (featuring Tauren Wells and SVRCINA)	2020	34	27	11	—		The Birth of a King
"Hark! The Herald Angels Sing" (featuring Kari Jobe)	2020	—	42	—	—		The Birth of a King
"Carol of the Bells" (with Crowder)	2023	44	6	6	—		Non-album single
"Joy to the World" (with Clark Beckham)	2023	—	38	—	—		The Birth of a King
"Little Drummer Boy" (with Stephen Stanley)	2025	20	33	27	—		Non-album single
"He Arose" (with Phil Wickham)	2026	24	—	—	4		The Resurrection of a King
"Nothing But the Blood" (with Jeremy Rosado)	2026	—	38	—	—		The Resurrection of a King
"—" denotes a recording that did not chart or was not released in that territory.

=== Other charted songs ===
Title	Year	Peak chart positions	Album
Title	Year	US Gospel	Album
"Jesus Paid It All" (with CeCe Winans)	2026	13	The Resurrection of a King

== Dove Awards ==
Year	Nominated	Award	Artist	Result
2015	Mansion	Rap/Hip Hop Album of the Year	NF	Nominated
2016	Therapy Session	Rap/Hip Hop Album of the Year	NF	Won
2016	"I Just Wanna Know"	Rap/Hip Hop Recorded Song of the Year	NF	Nominated
2017	Himself	Producer of the Year	Himself	Nominated
2018	War Cry (ft. Tauren Wells)	Rap/Hip Hop Recorded Song of the Year	Social Club Misfits	Won
2019	The Elements	Pop/Contemporary Album of the Year	TobyMac	Nominated
2019	I Know a Ghost	Pop/Contemporary Album of the Year	Crowder	Nominated
2026	The Resurrection of a King	Long Form Music Video of the Year	Himself	Won

== Film and television placements ==
Movie/Show title	Song title	Air Date	Ref.
Batwoman	"There's a Hero In You (Feat. Fleurie)"	October 26, 2019	
Nancy Drew	"Wake Me Up (Feat. Fleurie)"	October 8, 2019	
Tell Me A Story	"One Eye Open (Feat. Daniella Mason)"	October 3, 2019	
Station 19	"Can You Feel The Heat Now (Feat. Fleurie)"	October 4, 2019	
The Bold Type	"Can You Feel The Heat Now (Feat. Fleurie)"	May 28, 2019	
The Spanish Princess	"Gloria Regali (Feat. Fleurie)"	May 5, 2019	
World of Dance	"Wake Me Up" (Feat. Fleurie)"	May 5, 2019	
Marvel's Cloak & Dagger	"Can You Feel The Heat Now (Feat. Fleurie)"	April 24, 2019	
All American	"Warriors (Feat. Steven Malcolm)"	March 19, 2019	
Black Ink Crew: Chicago	"Takin Over"	March 6, 2019	
The Enemy Within	"Rise Above (Feat. Trella)"	February 25, 2019	
Siesta Key	"I'm a Ruler (Feat. Ruby Amanfu)"	January 22, 2019	
The Titan Games	"Warriors (Feat. Steven Malcolm)"	January 3, 2019	
Legacies	"Wake Me Up (Feat. Fleurie)"	December 5, 2018	
Legacies	"In The End (Feat. Jung Youth & Fleurie)"	November 28, 2018	
Charmed	"Wake Me Up (Feat. Fleurie)"	November 17, 2018	
The Girl in the Spider's Web	"Wicked (Feat. Royal & the Serpent)"	November 8, 2018	
Tell Me A Story	"Welcome to the Jungle"	October 31, 2018	
Hard Knocks	"Why" [NF]	August 7, 2018	
The Challenge: Champs vs. Stars	"Warriors (Feat. Steven Malcolm)"	June 19, 2018	
The Good Doctor	"Hold on for Your Life (Feat. Sam Tinnesz)"	January 7, 2018	
The Brave	"Hold on for Your Life (Feat. Sam Tinnesz)"	September 24, 2017	
Power	"We Runnin (Feat. Beacon Light)"	June 24, 2017	
Prison Break	"Hero (Feat. Mike Maine)"	April 4, 2017	
Black Ink Crew	"Grindin" [NF]	April 5, 2017	
Quantico	"Tomorrow We Fight"	March 19, 2017	
Quantico	"Hero"	February 19, 2017	
Reign	"Breathe (Feat. Fleurie)"	June 9, 2017	
Reign	"Hurts Like Hell (Feat. Fleurie)"	February 10, 2017	
The Expanse	"Whose Side Are You On (Feat. Ruelle)"	February 1, 2017	
Bones	"Breathe (Feat. Fleurie)"	January 3, 2017	
Queen Sugar	"Hurts Like Hell (Feat. Fleurie)"	September 7, 2016	
Containment	"Hurts Like Hell (Feat. Fleurie)"	May 31, 2016	
Containment	"Hurts Like Hell (Feat. Fleurie)"	May 24, 2016	
Love & Hip Hop: Atlanta	"Wake Up" [NF]	August 17, 2015	
Scream: The TV Series	"Hurts Like Hell (Feat. Fleurie)"	July 28, 2015	
