= Athletics at the 2025 Summer World University Games – Women's pole vault =

Women's pole vault at the 2025 Summer World University Games
- Venue: Lohrheidestadion
- Location: Bochum, Germany
- Dates: 24 July (qualification); 25 July (final)
- Competitors: 27
- Winning height: 4.60 m

Medalists
gold medal	Elien Vekemans	Belgium
silver medal	Kitty Faye	Norway
bronze medal	Rachel Grenke	Canada

The women's pole vault event at the 2025 Summer World University Games was held in Bochum, Germany, at Lohrheidestadion on 24 and 25 July.

== Records ==
Prior to the competition, the records were as follows:

Record	Athlete (nation)	Distance (m)	Location	Date
Games record	Tatyana Polnova (RUS)	4.70 m	Daegu, South Korea	27 August 2003

== Results ==
=== Qualification ===
All athletes over 4.35 m (Q) or at least the 12 best performers (q) advance to the final.

==== Group A ====
Place	Athlete	Nation	3.50	3.70	3.90	4.05	4.20	Result	Notes
1	Elien Vekemans	Belgium	-	-	-	-	o	4.20 m	q
1	Elise de Jong	Netherlands	-	-	-	o	o	4.20 m	q
1	Nemiah Munir	Great Britain	-	-	o	o	o	4.20 m	q
4	Tori Thomas	United States	-	-	-	xo	o	4.20 m	q
5	Tryphena Hewett	Australia	-	-	o	o	xo	4.20 m	q
6	Maja Chamot	Poland	-	-	o	xo	xxo	4.20 m	q
7	Chiara Sistermann	Germany	-	-	xo	o	xxx	4.05 m	
8	Gabriella Jönsson	Sweden	-	o	xo	xo	xxx	4.05 m	
9	Viktorie Ondrová	Czech Republic	-	-	-	xxo	xxx	4.05 m	
10	Hannah Adye	New Zealand	o	o	xo	xxx		3.90 m	
10	Luana Tews	Brazil	-	o	xo	xxx		3.90 m	
12	April Kippers	Canada	o	xxo	xxx			3.70 m	PB
13	Vanshika Ghanghas	India	o	xxx				3.50 m	
14	Javiera Moraga	Chile	xo	xxx				3.50 m	

==== Group B ====
Place	Athlete	Nation	3.50	3.70	3.90	4.05	4.20	Result	Notes
1	Julia Fixsen	United States	-	-	-	o	o	4.20 m	q
2	Rachel Grenke	Canada	-	o	o	xo	o	4.20 m	q
3	Kitty Friele Faye	Norway	-	-	-	-	o	4.20 m	q
4	Olha Belchenko	Ukraine	-	-	o	xo	xo	4.20 m	q
5	Gemma Tutton	Great Britain	-	-	-	xo	xxo	4.20 m	q
5	Miia Tillmann	Estonia	-	-	xo	o	xxo	4.20 m	q
7	Zofia Gaborska	Poland	-	-	o	xxx		3.90 m	
8	Paula Kļaviņa	Latvia	-	xo	xo	xxx		3.90 m	
9	Miré Reinstorf	South Africa	-	o	xxx			3.70 m	
10	Petra Garamvölgyi	Hungary	xo	o	xxx			3.70 m	
11	Javiera Contreras	Chile	o	xo	xxx			3.70 m	
12	N Daksitha	Sri Lanka	o	xxx				3.50 m	
—	G. Sindhushree	India	xxx					NM	

=== Final ===
Place	Athlete	Nation	4.05	4.20	4.30	4.35	4.40	4.45	4.50	4.55	4.60	4.70	Result	Notes
1st place, gold medalist(s)	Elien Vekemans	Belgium	-	-	o	-	-	o	-	o	o	xxx	4.60 m	
2nd place, silver medalist(s)	Kitty Friele Faye	Norway	-	o	o	-	xxo	-	xo	-	xxx		4.50 m	
3rd place, bronze medalist(s)	Rachel Grenke	Canada	o	o	o	xxo	xxx						4.35 m	PB
4	Elise de Jong	Netherlands	o	o	o	xxx							4.30 m	
5	Tori Thomas	United States	o	xo	o	xxx							4.30 m	
6	Miia Tillmann	Estonia	o	o	xxx								4.20 m	
6	Nemiah Munir	Great Britain	o	o	xxx								4.20 m	
8	Olha Belchenko	Ukraine	xo	o	xxx								4.20 m	
8	Tryphena Hewett	Australia	xo	o	xxx								4.20 m	
10	Maja Chamot	Poland	o	xxo	xxx								4.20 m	
10	Julia Fixsen	United States	o	xxo	-	xxx							4.20 m	
—	Gemma Tutton	Great Britain	xxx										NM	
