= 2024 World Athletics U20 Championships – Women's pole vault =

Women's pole vault at the 2024 World Athletics U20 Championships
- Venue: Estadio Atlético de la VIDENA
- Dates: 27 August 2024 (qualification); 29 August 2024 (final)
- Competitors: 34 from 25 nations
- Winning height: 4.47 m

Medalists
gold medal	Molly Haywood	United States
silver medal	Magdalena Rauter	Austria
bronze medal	Tryphena Hewett	Australia

The women's pole vault at the 2024 World Athletics U20 Championships was held at the Estadio Atlético de la VIDENA in Lima, Peru on 27 and 29 August 2024.

== Records ==
U20 standing records prior to the 2022 World Athletics U20 Championships were as follows:

Record	Athlete & Nationality	Mark	Location	Date
World U20 Record	Wilma Murto (FIN)	4.71	Zweibrücken, Germany	31 January 2016
Championship Record	Angelica Moser (SUI)	4.55	Bydgoszcz, Poland	21 July 2016
World U20 Leading	Hana Moll (USA)	4.64	Austin, Texas, United States	27 January 2024

== Results ==
=== Qualification ===
Athletes attaining a mark of at least 4.25 metres (Q) or at least the 12 best performers (q) qualified for the final.

==== Group A ====
Rank	Athlete	Nation	3.60	3.80	3.95	4.10	4.20	Mark	Notes
1	Molly Haywood	United States	–	–	–	o		4.10	q
1	Tryphena Hewett	Australia	o	o	o	o		4.10	q
1	Miia Tillmann	Estonia	–	o	o	o		4.10	q
4	Naiara Pérez	Spain	–	o	o	xo		4.10	q
5	Elise de Jong	Netherlands	o	xo	o	xo		4.10	q
5	Nicole Krutilová	Czech Republic	o	o	xo	xo		4.10	q
7	Payton Serraglio	Canada	–	xxo	xo	xxo		4.10	q, PB
8	Louise Boulent	France	–	o	o	xxx		3.95	q
8	Tamineh Steinmeyer	Germany	o	o	o	xxx		3.95	q
10	Rugilė Miklyčiūtė	Lithuania	o	xo	o	xxx		3.95	
11	Iliana Triantafyllou	Greece	–	o	xxo	xxx		3.95	
12	Rahime Yigit	Turkey	o	xo	xxo	xxx		3.95	
13	Lola Lepère	Belgium	–	o	xxx			3.80	
14	Paula Kļaviņa	Latvia	–	xo	xxx			3.80	
15	Marijn Kieft	Netherlands	o	xxo	xxx			3.80	
16	Valentina Praticò	Italy	xo	xxo	xxx			3.80	
17	Sydney Rothman	South Africa	xxo	xxx				3.65	

==== Group B ====
Rank	Athlete	Nation	3.60	3.80	3.95	4.10	4.20	Mark	Notes
1	Magdalena Rauter	Austria	o	o	o	o		4.10	q
2	Hannah Grace	United States	–	o	o	xo		4.10	q
3	Jade El Haouzy	France	–	o	o	xxo		4.10	q, PB
4	Anna Hiesinger	Germany	o	o	xo	xxx		3.95	
5	Sima Aškinezere	Latvia	–	o	xxx			3.80	
5	Klara Bjerregaard	Denmark	o	o	xxx			3.80	
5	Nora Eikeng	Norway	o	o	xxx			3.80	
5	Fiona Heinzmann	Switzerland	o	o	xxx			3.80	
5	Yarden Mantel	Israel	o	o	xxx			3.80	
10	Tuuli Järvinen	Finland	o	xo	xxx			3.80	
10	Carolina Scarponi	Argentina	o	xo	xxx			3.80	
12	Allika Inkeri Moser	Estonia	–	xxo	xxx			3.80	
12	Viktorie Ondrová	Czech Republic	–	xxo	xxx			3.80	
14	Júlia Calabretti	Brazil	o	xxx				3.60	
15	Giulia Busatta	Italy	xxo	xxx				3.60	
–	Mackenzie Hurtubise	Canada	xxx					NM	
–	Emma Mészáros	Hungary	xxx					NM	

=== Final ===
Rank	Athlete	Nation	3.80	3.95	4.05	4.15	4.20	4.25	4.25	4.47	4.52	Mark	Notes
1st place, gold medalist(s)	Molly Haywood	United States	–	–	–	o	–	xo	o	xxo	xxx	4.47	PB
2nd place, silver medalist(s)	Magdalena Rauter	Austria	o	xo	o	o	xxx					4.15	
3rd place, bronze medalist(s)	Tryphena Hewett	Australia	–	xxo	xo	xxo	xxx					4.15	
4	Hannah Grace	United States	xo	xo	o	xxx						4.05	
5	Louise Boulent	France	–	o	xo	xxx						4.05	
6	Naiara Pérez	Spain	o	xo	xo	xxx						4.05	
7	Nicole Krutilová	Czech Republic	o	o	xxo	xxx						4.05	
8	Jade El Haouzy	France	o	xo	xxo	xx–	x					4.05	
9	Elise de Jong	Netherlands	xxo	o	xxx							3.95	
10	Miia Tillmann	Estonia	o	xo	xxx							3.95	
11	Payton Serraglio	Canada	o	xxx								3.80	
11	Tamineh Steinmeyer	Germany	o	xxx								3.80	
