= 2025 European Athletics U23 Championships – Women's pole vault =

Women's pole vault at the 2025 European Athletics U23 Championships
- Venue: Fana Stadion
- Location: Bergen, Norway
- Dates: 18 July (qualification); 20 July (final)
- Winning height: 4.45 m PB

Medalists
gold medal	Viktorie Ondrová	Czech Republic
silver medal	Rugilė Miklyčiūtė	Lithuania
silver medal	Chiara Sistermann	Germany

The women's pole vault event at the 2025 European Athletics U23 Championships was held in Bergen, Norway, at Fana Stadion on 18 and 20 July.

== Records ==
Prior to the competition, the records were as follows:

Record	Athlete (nation)	Height (m)	Location	Date
European U23 record	Yelena Isinbayeva (RUS)	4.92 m	Brussels, Belgium	3 September 2004
Championship U23 record	Angelina Zhuk-Krasnova (RUS)	4.70 m	Tampere, Finland	13 July 2013

== Results ==
=== Qualification ===
All athletes over 4.35 m (Q) or at least 12 best (q) will advance to the final.

==== Group A ====
Place	Athlete	Nation	3.70	3.85	4.00	4.15	Result	Notes
1	Elise Russis	France	–	–	xo	o	4.15	q
2	Zofia Gaborska	Poland	–	o	xo	xo	4.15	q
2	Elze Kudulyte	Lithuania	xo	o	xo	xo	4.15	q, PB
4	Chiara Sistermann	Germany	–	–	xo	xo	4.15	q
5	Iliana Triantafyllou	Greece	–	xo	xo	xo	4.15	q
6	Fiona Heinzmann	Switzerland	–	o	o	xxo	4.15	q
6	Viktorie Ondrová	Czech Republic	–	–	o	xxo	4.15	q
8	Kristina Tergau	Netherlands	–	o	o	xxx	4.00	
8	Sara Winberg	Sweden	–	xo	o	xxx	4.00	
10	Paula Kļaviņa	Latvia	o	o	xo	xxx	4.00	
10	Gemma Tutton	United Kingdom	–	–	xo	xxx	4.00	
12	Fanni Kováts	Hungary	x	o	xxx		3.85	
12	Lola Lepère	Belgium	o	o	xxx		3.85	
14	Natalia Biskupska	Poland	xxo	o	xxx		3.85	
—	Romy Burkhard	Switzerland	–	xxx			NM	

==== Group B ====
Place	Athlete	Nation	3.70	3.85	4.00	4.15	Result	Notes
1	Lisa Gruber	Austria	–	0	o	o	4.15	q, =PB
2	Clara Fernández	Spain	o	o	xo	o	4.15	q
2	Rugilė Miklyčiūtė	Lithuania	–	o	xo	o	4.15	q
4	Miia Tillmann	Estonia	–	o	o	xo	4.15	q
5	Nayah Cauvin	France	–	–	o	xxo	4.15	q
6	Vita Benedetič	Slovenia	xo	o	o	xxx	4.00	
7	Maja Chamot	Poland	–	o	xo	xxx	4.00	
7	Great Nnachi	Italy	–	o	xo	xxx	4.00	
9	Niki Joannidu	Czech Republic	o	o	xxx		3.85	
9	Anastasia Retsa	Greece	–	o	xxx		3.85	
11	Tuuli Järvinen	Finland	xxo	o	xxx		3.85	
12	Alexandra Stucki	Switzerland	o	xxx			3.70	
13	Amalia Florou Dimitriadou	Greece	xo	xxx			3.70	
—	Alisona Neidere	Latvia	–	–	xxx		NM	

=== Final ===
Place	Athlete	Nation	3.95	4.10	4.20	4.30	4.35	4.40	4.45	4.50	Result	Notes
1st place, gold medalist(s)	Viktorie Ondrová	Czech Republic	o	o	o	xx-	o	o	xo	r	4.45	PB
2nd place, silver medalist(s)	Rugilė Miklyčiūtė	Lithuania	o	o	xxo	o	xo	xxx			4.35	NR
2nd place, silver medalist(s)	Chiara Sistermann	Germany	o	o	xxo	o	xo	x-	xx		4.35	PB
4	Elise Russis	France	–	xxo	xo	o	x-	xx			4.30	
5	Nayah Cauvin	France	o	xo	xo	xxo	xxx				4.30	
6	Zofia Gaborska	Poland	o	o	o	xxx					4.20	
6	Iliana Triantafyllou	Greece	o	o	o	x-	xx				4.20	
8	Miia Tillmann	Estonia	o	xo	xxx						4.10	
9	Clara Fernández	Spain	xo	xo	xxx						4.10	
9	Elze Kudulyte	Lithuania	xo	xo	xxx						4.10	
11	Lisa Gruber	Austria	o	xxx							3.95	
11	Fiona Heinzmann	Switzerland	o	xxx							3.95	
