= List of United States youth records in track and field =

United States Youth records in athletics are the best marks set in an event by an American athlete who will not reach their 18th birthday in the given year of competition. USATF, the United States governing body, does not keep records for the youth division. This list is compiled from IAAF lists and corresponds to IAAF definitions of the age division. USATF keeps outdoor youth division records here, but the age divisions do not correspond with IAAF divisions and records mostly outdated. A youth could be in the USATF 17-18 year division, but not qualify under the IAAF definition. Additionally, USATF rules limit eligibility for youth records to youth competitions, while IAAF accepts any performance by a qualified athlete in a properly conducted meet. Track and Field News also keeps only outdoor records and in many cases their records do not agree with USATF. All indoor records shown on this list are tracked by statisticians not officially sanctioned by the governing body.

== Outdoor ==
Key: Awaiting ratification Record not kept by USATF Not ratified or later rescinded by USATF

=== Boys ===
Event	Record	Athlete	Date	Meet	Place	Age	Ref.
100 m	10.06 (+2.0 m/s)	Christian Miller	8 July 2023	USA U20 Championships	Eugene, United States	17 years, 53 days	
200 m	19.84 (+0.3 m/s)	Erriyon Knighton	27 June 2021	US Olympic Trials	Eugene, United States	17 years, 149 days	
400 m	44.10	Quincy Wilson	12 July 2025	Ed Murphey Classic	Memphis, United States	17 years, 185 days	
800 m	1:42.27	Cooper Lutkenhaus	3 August 2025	USA Championships	Eugene, United States	16 years, 227 days	
1500 m	3:39.0 h	Jim Ryun	28 June 1964		New Brunswick, United States	17 years, 60 days	
Mile	3:59.0 h	Jim Ryun	5 June 1964		Compton, United States	17 years, 37 days	
3000 m	8:08.86	Joe Rosa	18 June 2010		Greensboro, United States	17 years, 69 days	
5000 m	14:11.2 h	John Zishka	4 July 1979		Boston, United States		
5000 m	13:43.95	Lex Young	6 May 2022		San Juan Capistrano, United States	17 years, 67 days	
10,000 m	29:06.8 h	Bill McChesney	20 March 1976		Eugene, United States	17 years, 72 days	
110m hurdles (91.4 cm)	13.18 (+0.2 m/s)	Wayne Davis	12 July 2007	World Youth Championships	Ostrava, Czech Republic	15 years, 324 days	
110 m hurdles	13.74 (−0.3 m/s)	Kevin Craddock	17 July 2004	World Junior Championships	Grosseto, Italy	17 years, 22 days	
400 m hurdles (84 cm)	49.01	William Wynne	15 July 2007	World Youth Championships	Ostrava, Czech Republic	17 years, 166 days	
400 m hurdles	49.56	Robert Griffin	1 August 2007	Knoxville AAU Junior Olympics	Knoxville United States	17 years, 170 days	
2000 m steeplechase	5:45.20	Bailey Roth	20 July 2013	World Youth Championships	Donetsk, Ukraine	17 years, 184 days	
3000 m steeplechase	9:06.3 h	John Gustafson	14 June 1975		Knoxville, United States		
High jump	2.28 m (7 ft 5 3/4 in)	Dothel Edwards	9 July 1983		Athens, United States	16 years, 303 days	
Pole vault	5.40 m (17 ft 8 1/2 in)	Brandon Bray	10 May 2014		Austin, Texas, United States	17 years, 16 days	
Long jump	7.94 m (26 ft 1/2 in)	Charles Smith	30 July 1983		New Britain, Connecticut, United States	17 years, 67 days	
Triple jump	15.98 m (52 ft 5 in) (+0.6 m/s)	Christian Taylor	14 July 2007	World Youth Championships	Ostrava, Czech Republic	17 years, 26 days	
Shot put (5 kg)	22.00 m (72 ft 2 in)	Adrian Piperi	July 15, 2015	World Youth Championships	Cali, Colombia	16 years, 176 days	
Shot put (5 kg)	22.38 m (73 ft 5 in)	Jackson Cantwell	14 June 2024	Nike Nationals	Eugene, United States	16 years, 18 days	
Shot put (6 kg)	20.62 m (67 ft 7 3/4 in)	Adrian Piperi	July 19, 2016	World Junior Championships	Bydgoszcz, Poland	17 years, 181 days	
Shot put (7.26 kg)	18.72 m (61 ft 5 in)	Arnold Campbell	May 18, 1983		Shreveport, United States	16 years, 184 days	
Discus throw (1.5 kg)	64.03 m (210 ft 3/4 in)	Jeff Buckey	4 November 1991		Bakersfield, United States	16 years, 247 days	
Discus throw (1.75 kg)	57.69 m (189 ft 3 1/4 in)	Matt Kosecki	June 22, 2008		Columbus, United States	17 years, 167 days	
Discus throw (2 kg)	49.56 m (162 ft 7 in)	Garrett Johnson	16 June 2001		Richmond, Virginia, United States	17 years, 23 days	
Hammer throw (5 kg)	80.39 m (263 ft 8 3/4 in)	Conor McCullough	June 1, 2008		Norwalk, United States	17 years, 122 days	
Hammer throw (6 kg)	75.88 m (248 ft 11 1/4 in)	Conor McCullough	July 12, 2008		Bydgoszcz, Poland	17 years, 163 days	
Hammer throw (7.26 kg)	64.28 m (210 ft 10 1/2 in)	Walter Henning	20 June 2006		Uniondale, United States	17 years, 147 days	
Hammer throw (7.26 kg)	73.43 m (240 ft 10 3/4 in)	Alec Faldermeyer	18 April 2009	Princeton Larry Ellis Invitational	Princeton, United States	16 years, 283 days	
Javelin throw (700 g)	76.88 m (252 ft 2 3/4 in)	Devin Bogert	August 22, 2010	Youth Olympic Games	Singapore	17 years, 87 days	
Javelin throw (800 g)	68.30 m (224 ft 3/4 in)	Kaleb Zuidema	May 5, 2010		Glen Rock, United States	17 years, 199 days	
Octathlon	6170 pts	Curtis Beach	12/07/2007	World Youth Championships	Ostrava, Czech Republic	16 years, 355 days	
Octathlon	11.20 (+0.4 m/s) (100 m), 6.69 m (+0.6 m/s) (long jump), 13.41 m (shot put), 48.82 (400 m) / 14.82 (−0.8 m/s) (110 m hurdles), 1.98 m (high jump), 42.01 m (javelin), 2:35.57 (1000 m)						
Decathlon	7493 pts	George Patrick	15–16 July 2015		Cali, Colombia		
Decathlon	100m / Long jump / Shot put / High jump / 400m / 110m H / Discus / Pole vault / Javelin / 1500m						
10,000 m walk (track)	41:23.14	Tyler Sorenson	9 July 2011	World Youth Championships	Lille, France	17 years, 141 days	
10 km walk (road)	44:27	Trevor Barron	29 March 2009	Pharr US Team Trials Race Walk Cup	Pharr, United States	16 years, 180 days	
4 × 100 m relay	39.95	Elite Speed Youth Track Club A Alex Sands; Cameron Douglas; Terry Conwell; Terryon Conwell	12 July 2015	Hoschton USATF U19 JO Region 4 Qualifier	Hoschton, United States	16 years, 352 days 16 years, 352 days 16 years, 352 days	
4 × 400 m relay	3:12.46	Miami Garden Xpress TC U20; Yohance Haynes; Tyrese Cooper; Justin Brown; Emare Hogan	24 May 2014	Orlando Golden South Classic	Orlando, United States	14 years, 64 days 16 years, 61 days	
Swedish medley relay	1:49.47	Ronald Darby; Aldrich Bailey; Najee Glass; Arman Hall	10 July 2011	World Youth Championships	Villeneuve-d'Ascq, France	17 years, 189 days 17 years, 154 days 17 years, 28 days 17 years, 148 days	

=== Girls ===
Event	Record	Athlete	Date	Meet	Place	Age	Ref.
100 m	10.98 (+2.0 m/s)	Candace Hill	June 20, 2015		Shoreline, United States	16 years, 129 days	
200 m	22.43 (−0.7 m/s)	Candace Hill	19 July 2015	World Youth Championships	Cali, Colombia	16 years, 158 days	
400 m	50.69	Sanya Richards	June 22, 2002		Palo Alto, United States	17 years, 116 days	
600 m	1:25.22	Sophia Gorriaran	30 April 2022	Penn Relays	Philadelphia, United States	16 years, 314 days	
800 m	1:59.51	Mary Cain	June 1, 2013	Prefontaine Classic	Eugene, United States	17 years, 29 days	
1500 m	4:04.62	Mary Cain	May 17, 2013		Eagle Rock, United States	17 years, 14 days	
3000 m	9:09.71 (Note: indoor mark ratified as absolute record)	Katelyn Tuohy	June 8, 2018	New York State Public High School Athletic Association State Championships	Cicero, United States	16 years, 82 days	
5000 m	15:34.47	Jenna Hutchins	December 11, 2020	Five and Dime Athletics Meeting	Columbia, United States	16 years, 261 days	
5000 m	15:25.27	Elizabeth Leachman	28 March 2024	Texas Relays	Austin, United States	16 years, 68 days	
10,000 m	33:26.53	Cathy Schiro	17 June 1984	US Olympic trials	Los Angeles, United States	16 years, 334 days	
2000 m steeplechase	6:29.20	Madeleine Meyers	July 10, 2011	World Youth Championships	Lille, France	16 years, 345 days	
2000 m steeplechase	6:29.08	Sarah Trainor	May 4, 2019	Race at the Oval Office	New York City, United States	16 years, 346 days	
3000 m steeplechase	10:15.26	Marie Lawrence	23 June 2006		Indianapolis, United States	16 years, 304 days	
100 m hurdles (76.2 cm)	12.95 (+0.7 m/s)	Alexis Duncan	16 July 2015	World Youth Championships	Cali, Colombia	16 years, 334 days	
100m hurdles (83.8 cm)	12.84 (+1.2 m/s)	Tia Jones	25 June 2016	United States Junior Championships	Clovis, United States	15 years, 291 days	
400 m hurdles	54.15	Sydney McLaughlin	10 July 2016	United States Olympic Trials	Eugene, United States	16 years, 338 days	
High jump	1.96 m (6 ft 5 in)	Vashti Cunningham	1 August 2015	Pan American Junior Championships	Edmonton, Canada	17 years, 195 days	
Pole vault	4.51 m	Amanda Moll	25 March 2022	Texas Relays	Austin, United States	17 years, 53 days	
Long jump	6.60 m (21 ft 7 3/4 in) (+0.3 m/s)	Carol Lewis	17 July 1980		Philadelphia, United States	16 years, 344 days	
Long jump	6.68 m (21 ft 10 3/4 in) (+0.7 m/s)	Lanae-Tava Thomas	26 July 2017	USA Track and Field Junior Olympic Championships	Lawrence, United States	16 years, 179 days	
Triple jump	13.71 m (44 ft 11 3/4 in) (+1.4 m/s)	Brittany Daniels	27 June 2004		College Station, Texas, United States	16 years, 279 days	
Shot put (3 kg)	18.31 m (60 ft 3/4 in)	Alyssa Wilson	5 June 2016	Monmouth University Shot Put Meeting	West Long Branch, United States	17 years, 106 days	
Shot put (4 kg)	17.00 m (55 ft 9 1/4 in)	Alyssa Wilson	19 June 2016	Greensboro New Balance Nationals	Greensboro, United States	17 years, 120 days	
Discus throw	56.49 m (185 ft 4 in)	Melanie Uher	16 April 2002		DeWitt, United States	17 years, 15 days	
Hammer throw	65.32 m (214 ft 3 1/2 in)	Shelby Ashe	15 June 2010		Marietta, Georgia, United States	17 years, 94 days	
Javelin throw	56.59 m (185 ft 7 3/4 in)	Madison Wiltrout	7 May 2015	North Huntingdon WPIAL AAA Qualifier	North Huntingdon, United States	15 years, 337 days	
Heptathlon	5578 pts	Kendell Williams	12-13 July 2012	World Junior Championships	Barcelona, Spain	17 years, 28 days	
Heptathlon	13.74 (−1.0 m/s) (100m hurdles), 1.81m (high jump), 10.70m (shot put), 24.94 (−1.5 m/s) (200m) / 6.11m (+2.9 m/s) (long jump), 30.48m (javelin), 2:26.60 (800m)						
5000 m walk (track)	23:00.78	Anya-Maria Ruoss	23 July 1994		Lisbon, Portugal		
5000 m walk (track)	22:38.16	Taylor Ewert	28 April 2018	Penn Relays	Philadelphia, United States	16 years, 158 days	
5 km walk (road)	23:08	Taylor Ewert	10 August 2018	USA vs. Canada Junior Race Walk match	Toronto Islands, Canada	16 years, 262 days	
10,000 m walk (track)	45:57.81	Taylor Ewert	14 July 2018	World U20 Championships	Tampere, Finland	16 years, 235 days	
4 × 100 m relay	45.17	Buford HS; Trinity Price; Alexa Rossum; Trinity Rossum; Kimberly Harris	11 May 2021	Carrollton GHSA State Championships	Carrollton, United States	17 years, 125 days 15 years, 40 days 15 years, 304 days	
4 × 400 m relay	3:40.14	National Team; Talitha Diggs; Kimberly Harris; Kennaria Gadson; Kami Joi Hickson	9 June 2019	Memorial Barrientos	Havana, Cuba	16 years, 291 days 16 years, 333 days 17 years, 43 days 17 years, 150 days	
Medley relay	2:03.83	National Team; Ashley Lodree; Allyson Felix; Angel Perkins-Mclean; Stephanie Smith	15 July 2001	World Youth Championships	Debrecen, Hungary	15 years, 266 days 15 years, 239 days 16 years, 283 days 16 years, 18 days	

== Indoor ==
=== Boys ===
Event	Record	Athlete	Date	Meet	Place	Age	Ref.
50 m	5.81	Jeremy Rankin	11 March 2007		Landover, United States	16 years, 169 days	
55 m	6.48	Brenen Garrett	14 March 2015		Landover, United States		
60 m	6.65	Marcellus Moore	16 February 2019	UK Invitational	Lexington, United States	16 years, 231 days	
60 m	6.59	Dillon Mitchell	1 March 2026	USA Championships	Staten Island, United States	16 years, 87 days	
200 m	20.79	Nyckoles Harbor	22 January 2022	Texas Tech Under Armour High School Classic	Lubbock, United States	16 years, 201 days	
300 m	32.87	Tyrese Cooper	4 February 2017	Armory Track Invitational	New York City, United States	16 years, 320 days	
400 m	45.66	Quincy Wilson	2 February 2025	New Balance Indoor Grand Prix	Boston, United States	17 years, 25 days	
600 m	1:16.20	Quincy Wilson	8 February 2025	Millrose Games	New York City, United States	17 years, 31 days	
800 m	1:44.03	Cooper Lutkenhaus	14 February 2026	Sound Invite	Winston-Salem, United States	17 years, 57 days	
1000 m	2:24.18	Marcus Reilly	30 January 2022	Boston University John Thomas Terrier Classic	Boston, United States	16 years, 78 days	
1500 m	3:52.50	Andy Powell	March 9, 1997	National Scholastic Indoor Championships	Boston, United States	16 years, 351 days	
Mile	4:07.04	Marcus Reilly	February 27, 2022	Boston University Last Chance Meet	Boston, United States	16 years, 106 days	
3000 m	7:57.06	Lex Young	February 5, 2022	Dr. Sander Invitational	New York City, United States	16 years, 342 days	
5000 m	13:59.96	Daniel Simmons	11 March 2023	New Balance Nationals Indoor	Boston, United States	17 years, 39 days	
50 m hurdles (99/100 cm)	6.69	Wayne Davis	March 11, 2007		Landover, United States	15 years, 201 days	
55 m hurdles (99/100 cm)	7.63	Ja Shawn Combs	March 12, 2011		Hillside, United States		
60 m hurdles (99/100 cm)	7.62	Wayne Davis	March 16, 2008		Landover, United States	16 years, 207 days	
High jump	2.18 m	Scott Sellers	11 January 2003	Carl Lewis Invitational	Houston, United States	16 years, 148 days	
High jump	2.18 m	Dartis Willis	18 December 2010	Great Lakes Classic	Ypsilanti, United States	17 years, 88 days	
Pole vault	5.34 m	Andrew Irwin	15 May 2010	Arkansas Vault Club Gravity Cheater Vault Meet	Black Springs, United States	17 years, 112 days	
Long jump	7.80 m	Ja'Mari Ward	14 March 2015	New Balance Nationals Indoor	New York City, United States	16 years, 358 days	
Triple jump	13.96 m	Dexter Neboh	March 15, 2015		Landover, United States		
Shot put	19.29 m	Jeremy Kline	March 12, 2011		Hillside, United States		
4 × 200 m relay	1:26.09	Long Beach Polytechnic High School; Isaiah Green; Vincent Joseph; Travon Patterson; Bryshon Nellum	March 13, 2005	National Scholastic Indoor Championships	New York City, United States	15 years, 215 days 17 years, 52 days 16 years, 174 days 15 years, 316 days	
4 × 400 m relay	3:23.04	Zebulon B. Vance TC, Charlotte; Lamar Johnson; Erin Jenkins; Cameron Tate; Jarrett Samuels	March 14, 2010	Nike Indoor Nationals	Boston, United States		

=== Girls ===
Event	Record	Athlete	Date	Meet	Place	Age	Ref.
50 m	6.28	Victoria Jordan	March 11, 2007		Landover, Maryland, United States	17 years, 13 days	
55 m	6.67+	Melanie Doggett	8 February 2025	Millrose Games	New York City, United States	13 years, 250 days	
60 m	7.17	Melanie Doggett	8 February 2025	Millrose Games	New York City, United States	13 years, 250 days	
200 m	23.22	Sanya Richards	March 10, 2002	New Balance Nationals Indoor	New York City, United States	17 years, 12 days	
300 m	37.38	Kayla Davis	18 January 2020	The VA Showcase	Lynchburg, United States	16 years, 28 days	
400 m	51.84	Sydney McLaughlin	March 13, 2016	New Balance Nationals Indoor	New York City, United States	16 years, 219 days	
600 m	1:23.57	Athing Mu	February 24, 2019	USA Championships	Staten Island, United States	16 years, 261 days	
800 m	2:00.58	Sophia Gorriaran	11 February 2022	BU David Hemery Valentine Invitational	Boston, United States	16 years, 236 days	
1000 m	2:41.53	Roisin Willis	February 20, 2021	CYUP Misfits Invitational	Chicago, United States	16 years, 198 days	
1500 m	4:11.72+	Mary Cain	16 February 2013	Millrose Games	New York, United States	16 years, 289 days	
Mile	4:28.25	Mary Cain	16 February 2013	Millrose Games	New York, United States	16 years, 289 days	
3000 m	9:01.81	Katelyn Tuohy	26 January 2019	Dr. Sander Columbia Challenge	New York City, United States	16 years, 314 days	
3000 m	9:00.16 OT (Note: Non-ratifiable as the track was an oversized track and not a 200m track eligible for indoor record-purposes)	Alexa Efraimson	February 1, 2014	Seattle Washington Invitational	Seattle, United States	16 years, 346 days	
Two miles	9:38.68	Mary Cain	2 February 2013	New Balance Indoor Grand Prix	Boston, United States	16 years, 275 days	
5000 m	15:28.90	Elizabeth Leachman	9 March 2024	Nike Indoor Nationals	New York City, United States	15 years, 361 days	
50 m hurdles (84 cm)	6.95	Candy Young	February 3, 1979		Edmonton, Canada	16 years, 258 days	
55 m hurdles (84 cm)	8.12	Sierra Brabham Lawrence	March 9, 2014		Landover, United States		
60 m hurdles (84 cm)	8.05	Grace Stark	11 March 2018	New Balance Nationals Indoor	New York City, United States	16 years, 309 days	
High jump	1.91 m	Morgan Smalls	8 March 2019	New Balance Nationals Indoor	New York City, United States	16 years, 301 days	
Pole vault	4.50 m	Amanda Moll	27 February 2022	USA Championships	Spokane, United States	17 years, 27 days	
Long jump	6.47 m	Ava Kitchings	8 February 2025	Millrose Games	New York City, United States	16 years, 346 days	
Triple jump	13.10 m	Jasmine Moore	11 March 2018	New Balance Nationals Indoor	New York City, United States	16 years, 314 days	
Shot put	16.73 m	Alyssa Wilson	1 March 2016	New York Eastern States Championships	New York City, United States	17 years, 10 days	
Pentathlon	4054 pts	Anna Hall	10 March 2018	New Balance Nationals Indoor	New York City, United States	16 years, 352 days	
Pentathlon	8.82 (60 m hurdles), 1.74 m (high jump), 11.06 m (shot put), 5.68 m (long jump), 2:17.98 (800 m)						
4 × 400 m relay	3:39.70	Bullis School; Lauryn Harris; Leah Phillips; Masai Russell; Shaniya Hall	12 March 2017	New Balance Nationals Indoor	New York City, United States	14 years, 210 days 16 years, 268 days 15 years, 151 days	
