= 2022 World Athletics U20 Championships – Women's pole vault =

Women's pole vault at the 2022 World Athletics U20 Championships
- Venue: Estadio Olímpico Pascual Guerrero
- Dates: 1 August (qualification); 4 August (final)
- Competitors: 21 from 14 nations
- Winning height: 4.35

Medalists
gold medal	Hana Moll	United States
silver medal	Chiara Sistermann	Germany
bronze medal	Janne Sophie Ohrt	Germany

The women's pole vault at the 2022 World Athletics U20 Championships was held at the Estadio Olímpico Pascual Guerrero on 1 and 4 August.

== Records ==
U20 standing records prior to the 2022 World Athletics U20 Championships were as follows:

Record	Athlete & Nationality	Mark	Location	Date
World U20 Record	Wilma Murto (FIN)	4.71	Zweibrücken, Germany	31 January 2016
Championship Record	Angelica Moser (SUI)	4.55	Bydgoszcz, Poland	21 July 2016
World U20 Leading	Amanda Moll (USA)	4.51	Austin, Texas, United States	25 March 2022

== Results ==
=== Qualification ===
The qualification round took place on 1 August, in two groups, both starting at 15:35. Athletes attaining a mark of at least 4.25 metres ( Q ) or at least the 12 best performers ( q ) qualified for the final.

Rank	Group	Name	Nationality	3.60	3.80	3.95	4.05	4.15	4.20	4.25	Mark	Notes
1	A	Gemma Tutton	Great Britain	-	-	o	o				4.05	q
1	B	Léa Mauberret	France	-	o	o	o				4.05	q
1	B	Heather Abadie	Canada	-	-	o	o				4.05	q
1	B	Hana Moll	United States	-	-	o	o				4.05	q
1	A	Sara Winberg	Sweden	o	o	o	o				4.05	q
6	A	Amanda Moll	United States	-	-	xo	o				4.05	q
7	A	Chiara Sistermann	Germany	-	xo	xo	o				4.05	q
8	A	Cassidy Bradshaw	Australia	xo	o	xxo	o				4.05	q
9	B	Janne Sophie Ohrt	Germany	o	xo	o	xo				4.05	q
10	B	Elise Russis	France	-	-	xxo	xo				4.05	q
11	A	Silja Andersson	Sweden	-	-	o	xxo				4.05	q
12	B	Sophie Ashurst	Great Britain	-	o	xo	xxo				4.05	q
13	A	Iliana Triantafyllou	Greece	xo	xo	o	xxo				4.05	q
14	A	Clara Fernández	Spain	o	xo	o	xxx				3.95	
15	B	Anastasia Retsa	Greece	xo	xxo	xo	xxx				3.95	
16	B	Petra Garamvölgyi	Hungary	-	xo	xxo	xxx				3.95	
17	B	Alisona Diāna Neidere	Latvia	-	o	xxx					3.80	
17	A	Sonya Urbanowicz	Canada	o	o	xxx					3.80	
19	A	Romy Burkhard	Switzerland	-	xxo	xxx					3.80	
	B	Alejandra Saborit	Spain	xxx							NM	
	A	Carol Ruíz	Colombia	xxx							NM	

=== Final ===
The final started at 11:01 on 4 August.

Rank	Name	Nationality	3.95	4.10	4.20	4.30	4.35	4.40	4.45	Mark	Notes
1st place, gold medalist(s)	Hana Moll	United States	o	o	o	xo	xxo	-	xxx	4.35	
2nd place, silver medalist(s)	Chiara Sistermann	Germany	o	xo	o	o	xxx			4.30	PB
3rd place, bronze medalist(s)	Janne Sophie Ohrt	Germany	o	o	o	xxo	xxx			4.30	PB
4	Elise Russis	France	o	xxo	o	xx-	x			4.20	
5	Amanda Moll	United States	-	o	xo	xxx				4.20	
6	Silja Andersson	Sweden	o	o	xxx					4.10	
7	Sophie Ashurst	Great Britain	o	o	xxx					4.10	
8	Heather Abadie	Canada	xo	o	xxx					4.10	
9	Léa Mauberret	France	xo	xo	xxx					4.10	
10	Gemma Tutton	Great Britain	o	xxo	xxx					4.10	PB
10	Sara Winberg	Sweden	o	xxo	xxx					4.10	SB
12	Iliana Triantafyllou	Greece	o	xxx						3.95	
13	Cassidy Bradshaw	Australia	xo	xxx						3.95	
