= 2023 European Athletics U23 Championships – Women's pole vault =

Women's pole vault at the 2023 European Athletics U23 Championships
- Venue: Leppävaara Stadium
- Location: Espoo, Finland
- Dates: 13 July (qualification); 15 July (final)
- Competitors: 20 from 14 nations
- Winning height: 4.50 m

Medalists
gold medal	Marie-Julie Bonnin	France
silver medal	Elien Vekemans	Belgium
bronze medal	Kitty Friele Faye	Norway

The women's pole vault event at the 2023 European Athletics U23 Championships was held in Espoo, Finland, at Leppävaara Stadium on 13 and 15 July.

== Records ==
Prior to the competition, the records were as follows:

European U23 record	Yelena Isinbayeva (RUS)	4.92 m	Brussels, Belgium	3 September 2004
Championship U23 record	Angelina Zhuk-Krasnova (RUS)	4.70 m	Tampere, Finland	13 July 2013

== Results ==
=== Qualification ===
Qualification rules: All athletes over 4.30 m (Q) or at least 12 best (q) will advance to the final.

Rank	Group	Name	Nationality	3.70	3.85	4.00	4.10	4.20	4.30	Mark	Notes
1	A	Karlijn Schouten	Netherlands	o	o	o	o	o		4.20	q
1	B	Ana Carrsco	Spain	–	o	o	o	o		4.20	q
3	A	Silja Andersson	Finland	–	–	xo	o	o		4.20	q
3	A	Marleen Mülla	Estonia	–	–	o	xo	o		4.20	q
3	B	Kitty Friele Faye	Norway	–	–	o	xo	o		4.20	q
6	A	Sarah Franziska Vogel	Germany	–	–	o	xxo	o		4.20	q
7	A	Léa Mauberret	France	–	–	o	o	xo		4.20	q
7	B	Elien Vekemans	Belgium	–	–	o	–	xo		4.20	q
7	B	Elise Russis	France	–	–	o	o	xo		4.20	q
10	B	Marie-Julie Bonnin	France	–	–	–	o	xxo		4.20	q
11	B	Jade Spencer-Smith	Great Britain	–	o	o	xxo	xxo		4.20	q
12	B	Anastasia Retsa	Greece	–	o	o	o	xxx		4.10	q
13	B	Giada Pozzato	Italy	–	o	xo	o	xxx		4.10	q
14	A	Giulia Valletti Borgnini	Italy	–	–	xxo	o	xxx		4.10	
15	A	Sina Ettlin	Switzerland	–	o	o	xo	xxx		4.10	
16	A	Petra Garamvölgyi	Hungary	xo	o	xo	xo	xxx		4.10	
17	A	Emma Rovasalo	Finland	o	o	xxx				3.85	
17	A	Gabriella Jönsson	Sweden	o	o	xxx				3.85	
19	B	Maja Gebauer	Hungary	xo	xxx					3.70	
19	B	Essi Melender	Finland	xo	xxx					3.70	

=== Final ===
Rank	Name	Nationality	4.00	4.15	4.30	4.40	4.45	4.50	Mark	Notes
1st place, gold medalist(s)	Marie-Julie Bonnin	France	–	–	xxo	o	xo	xxo	4.50	EU23L
2nd place, silver medalist(s)	Elien Vekemans	Belgium	–	o	xo	o	xo	xxx	4.45	
3rd place, bronze medalist(s)	Kitty Friele Faye	Norway	o	o	xxo	o	xxx		4.40	PB
4	Sarah Franziska Vogel	Germany	o	o	o	xxx			4.30	
5	Marleen Mülla	Estonia	xo	o	o	xx-	x		4.30	
6	Silja Andersson	Finland	xo	o	xxo	xxx			4.30	=PB
6	Léa Mauberret	France	xo	o	xxo	x-	xx		4.30	=PB
8	Karlijn Schouten	Netherlands	xxo	o	xxx				4.15	
9	Ana Carrsco	Spain	o	xxo	xxx				4.15	
10	Giada Pozzato	Italy	o	xxx					4.00	
10	Anastasia Retsa	Greece	o	xxx					4.00	
12	Elise Russis	France	xo	xxx					4.00	
	Jade Spencer-Smith	Great Britain	xxx						NM	
