= Chiara Sistermann =

German athlete

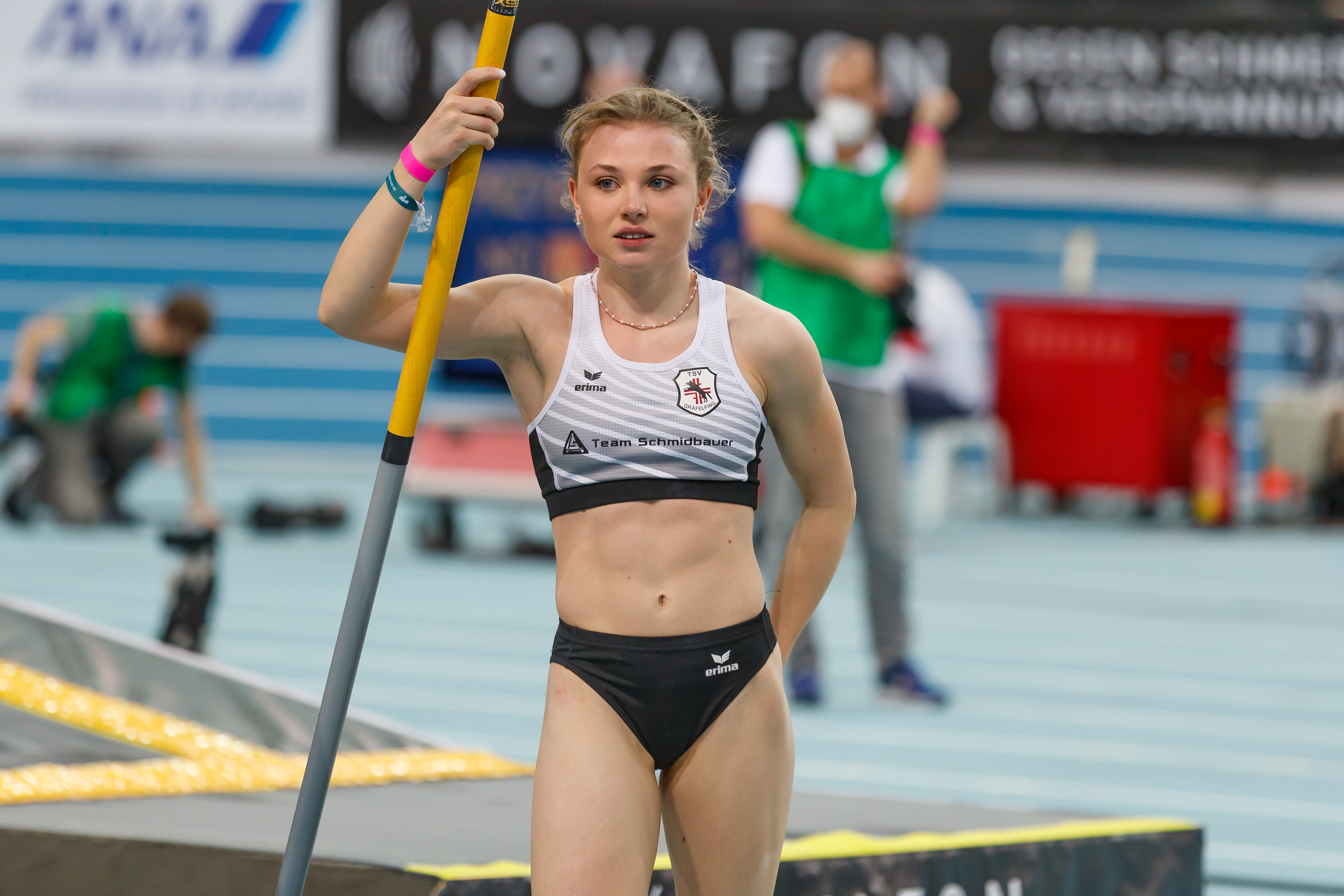
- Sistermann in 2022

Personal information
- Born: 26 April 2004 (age 22)

Sport
- Sport: Athletics
- Event: Pole Vault

Achievements and titles
- Personal best: Pole vault: 4.35m (2025)
Medal record
Women's athletics
Representing Germany
European U23 Championships
| Bronze medal – third place | 2025 Bergen | Pole vault |
World U20 Championships
| Silver medal – second place | 2022 Cali | Pole vault |

Chiara Sistermann (born 26 April 2004) is a German pole vaulter.

== Biography ==
From Munich, Sistermann began training in gymnastics from the age of six years-old before becoming a member of TSV Gräfelfing and focusing on the pole vault. She placed fourth at 2021 European Athletics U20 Championships in Tallinn, Estonia, with a best height of 4.10 metres.

Sistermann had a third place finish at the 2022 German Indoor Athletics Championships in Leipzig. In July 2022, Sistermann won the German U20 Championships pole vault title with a clearance of 4.20 metres in Ulm. Sistermann won the silver medal behind Hana Moll at the 2022 World Athletics U20 Championships in Cali, Colombia, in August 2022, clearing 4.30 metres for an outdoor lifetime best to finish ahead of compatriot Janna Sophie Ohrt in the medal positions.

After overcoming foot surgery, in July 2023, Sistermann cleared a personal best 4.31 metres to place second at the senior German Athletics Championships in Düsseldorf as a 19 year-old. That year, she moved from Gräfelfing to the United States to compete at Virginia Tech under coach Bob Phillips, as part of a training group that included Olympian Bridget Williams, although a knee injury suffered in early 2024 initially restricted her ability to compete, she was able to comeback to make the final of the 2024 NCAA Division I Outdoor Track and Field Championships in Eugene, Oregon in June 2024.

In February 2025, Sistermann clesred 4.35 metres for the first time at the Virginia Tech Challenge in Blacksburg, Virginia. After winning the German U23 title in Ulm, Sisteremann equalled her personal best of 4.35 metres to win the bronze medal at the 2025 European Athletics U23 Championships in Bergen, Norway, finishing behind Czech athlete Viktorie Ondrová and Rugilė Miklyčiūtė of Lithuania.

In March 2024, she placed fourteenth overall at the 2026 NCAA Indoor Championships. In June 2026, she qualified for the 2026 NCAA Outdoor Championships.
