= Newbury Park High School =

Public high school in California, United States

Location
- 456 North Reino Road; Newbury Park, California 91320; United States; 34°11′2″N 118°57′9″W

Information
- Type: Public high school
- Established: 1967
- School district: Conejo Valley Unified School District
- Principal: Steve LePire
- Teaching staff: 96.25 (FTE)
- Enrollment: 2,080 (2023–2024)
- Student to teacher ratio: 21.61
- Colors: Black and gold
- Athletics conference: CIF Southern Section; Marmonte League
- Nickname: Panthers
- Newspaper: Panther Prowler
- Website: NPHS

Newbury Park High School, opened in 1967, is a co-educational public high school located in Newbury Park, California.

== Academics ==
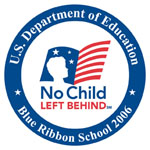
NPHS was a 2006 Winner.

The school is one of two International Baccalaureate schools in Ventura County, the other being Rio Mesa High School.

In 2006, NPHS underwent a technological overhaul including the addition of new computers and the introduction of Zangle. Implemented at the beginning of the 2006-2007 academic year, Zangle is an online system by Aequitas Solutions for teachers to input and submit grading online, as well as allowing parents to access their child's attendance and grade information. In 2013, Zangle changed its name to "Q", but still performed the same tasks as before.

A second technological overhaul began in the 2015-2016 school year. This included boosted funding for the Panther TV student broadcast program, new Lenovo desktop computers with faster Intel cores and smaller frames, and purchase of charging station carts with Chromebooks or traditional laptops for every department. The school internet system was also revised to be faster, more bring-your-own-device friendly (in terms of ease of Wi-Fi connection), and better security blocks.

NPHS has a technology academy on campus known as the Digital Arts and Technology Academy, or "DATA." This program is for sophomores, juniors and seniors who are selected by faculty to join. The students are enrolled in English, Social Science, Science, and a Technology class together.

== Athletics ==
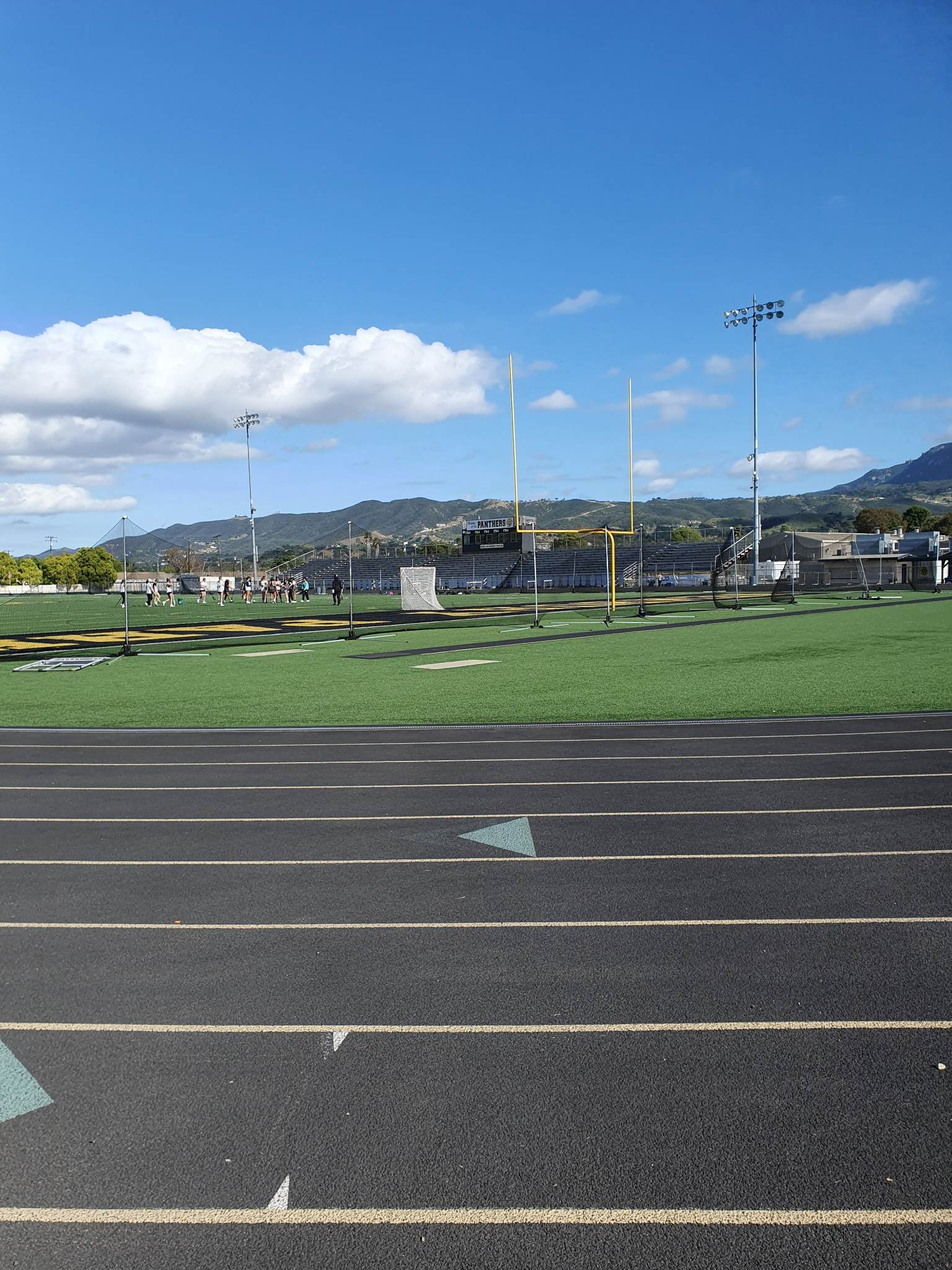
Panther Stadium, Newbury Park High School Stadium

Newbury Park's athletic teams are known as the Panthers, and the school colors are black and gold. The following sports are offered:

- Baseball (boys)
- Basketball (girls & boys)
- Cross country (girls & boys)
- Fencing Club (one of the longest surviving clubs on campus).
- Football (boys and girls)
- Golf (girls & boys)
- Lacrosse (girls & boys)
- Softball (girls)
- Soccer (girls & boys)
- Stunt (girls & boys)
- Swimming (girls & boys)
- Tennis (girls & boys)
- Track & field (girls & boys)
- Volleyball (girls & boys)
- Water polo (girls & boys)
- Wrestling (girls & boys)

== Major Championships ==
- Women's BasketballSouthern California State Champions 1995
- Dance Team National Grand Champions 2012, USA National Sweepstakes Champions 2015
- Boys Cross Country Division II CIF 2018 State Champion
- Girls Cross Country Division II CIF 2019 State Champion
- Boys Cross Country Division II CIF 2019 State Champion
- Boys NXN Nike Cross Nationals 2019 Champion
- Boys Cross Country 2021 Garmin RunningLane National Champions
- Boys Cross Country Division II CIF 2022 State Champion
- Boys NXN Nike Cross Nationals 2022 Champion

At the 2021 Garmin RunningLane National Championships, Newbury Park runner Colin Sahlman finished in first, followed by brothers Leo Young and Lex Young who finished in second and third, respectively. All three broke Dathan Ritzenhein's previous national high school cross country 5k record of 14:10.

Newbury Park also holds the national high school record for the 4 x Mile relay.

== Notable alumni ==
- Jordan Cameron, football player in the NFL
- Colby Cameron, football player in the NFL
- Belinda Carlisle, singer
- Devon Lee Carlson, fashion influencer and entrepreneur
- Hailey Clauson, Sports Illustrated swimsuit model
- Wayne Cook, football player
- Lorna Doom, born Teresa Ryan, bass guitarist in The Germs
- Heather Locklear, actress
- Adam Long, actor
- M. Ward, musician, producer
- Katie Meyer, college soccer player
- Tara McKeown, professional soccer player
- Jason Narvy, actor
- Jesse James Rutherford, singer
- Colin Sahlman, runner
- Jimmie Sherfy, pitcher for Arizona Diamondbacks
- Brady Smigiel, college football quarterback for the Michigan Wolverines
- Will Svitek, football player in the NFL
- Kim Woo-sung, singer in The Rose
- Shirley Wu, award-winning data scientist
- Leo Young, long-distance runner who competed in the 2023 World Athletics Cross Country Championships
- Lex Young, long-distance runner
- Nico Young, long-distance runner who qualified for the Olympic 10k in 2024 for Team USA
- Cameron Rising, college football quarterback for the University of Utah.
