= Leo Young (runner) =

American long-distance runner (born 2005)

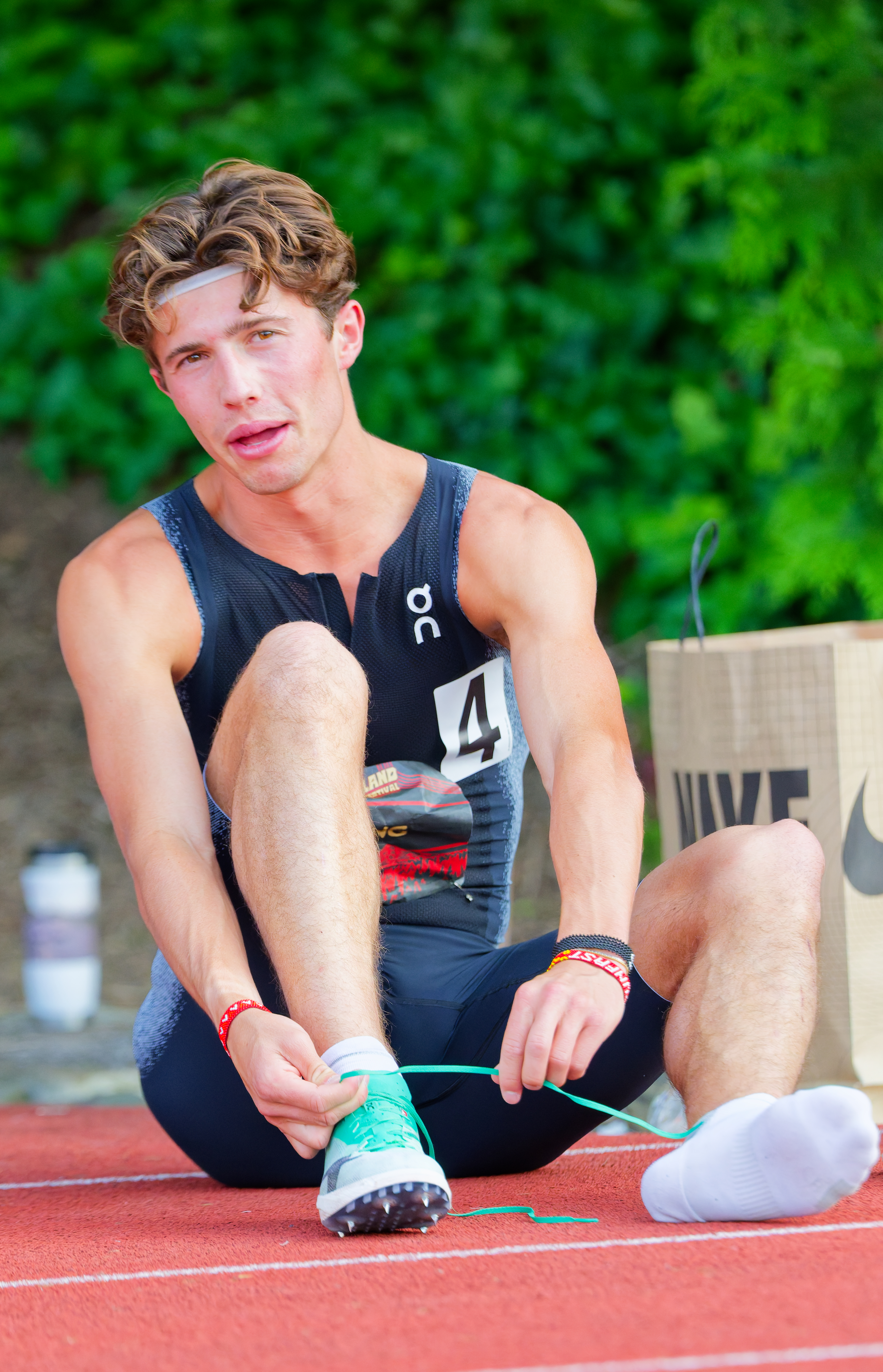
- Young in 2025

Personal information
- Full name: Emilio Martin Young
- Born: 28 February 2005 (age 21) US

Sport
- Country: US
- Sport: Athletics
- Event: Long-distance running
- Team: Stanford

Achievements and titles
- Personal bests: 1500 m: 3:35.96 (Portland 2025); 1600 m: 3:59.32 (Azusa 2022); Mile: 3:56.48 (Seattle 2025); 3000 m: 7:52.38 (Seattle 2024); 3200 m: 8:39.57 (Azusa 2022); 5000 m: 13:24.15 (Boston 2024)
Medal record
Men's athletics
Representing the United States
World Cross Country Championships
Bronze medal – third place	2023 Bathurst	Junior team

Emilio Martin Young (born February 28, 2005) is an American long-distance runner. Competing as part of the junior team, he won a bronze medal at the 2023 World Athletics Cross Country Championships.

He is the twin brother of Lex Young and younger brother of Nico Young, who competed at Northern Arizona University and is an Olympian in the 10,000 meters. Young attended Newbury Park High School in California, and matriculated to Stanford University.

== Running career ==
=== 2019 ===
At the Nike Cross Nationals in Portland, Oregon, Young was the lone freshman on the champion Newbury Park team, led by his brother Nico.

=== 2021 ===
At the Woodbridge Invitational, Young improved upon his brother Nico's course record, running 13:38.1, considered a high school national record for 3 miles.

At the Garmin RunningLane Cross Country Championships in Huntsville, Alabama, the top three athletes from Newbury Park all broke Dathan Ritzenhein's cross country 5 kilometer high school national record of 14:10 set in 2000. In this race, Colin Sahlman won in 14:03.29, Leo finished second in 14:05.07, and his twin brother Lex finished third at 14:05.49. It has been called the greatest high school cross country team in history.

=== 2022 ===
At the New Balance Indoor Nationals, Newbury Park broke the national 4 × mile relay record. Young ran the second leg in 4:06.86. Their team lowered the record from 17:01.81 to 16:29.31.

In August, the Young twins committed to run for Stanford University.

=== 2023 ===
On January 21, Young won the USATF National Cross Country Championships with a 8k time of 23:47. This performance qualified him to be on the US U20 Cross Country team and compete in the 2023 World Athletics Cross Country Championships U20 men's race in Bathurst, Australia. On February 18, Young finished 16th place in the championship, the fastest time for a non-East African athlete. He led the US team to a bronze medal finish with a total of 81 points.

Later that year on November 19, Young signed an NIL deal with the Swiss shoe company On. His twin brother Lex also signed the same contract becoming the 5th and 6th Stanford track athletes to have an NIL deal with On.

== Personal life ==
Young and his twin brother Lex are YouTube vloggers, under the handle L&L.
