= Lex Young =

American long-distance runner (born 2005)

Personal information
- Full name: Alexio Randolph Young
- Born: February 28, 2005 (age 21)

Sport
- Country: US
- Sport: Athletics
- Event: Long-distance Running
- Team: Stanford

Achievements and titles
- Personal bests: 1500 m: 3:46.49 (Palo Alto 2026); 1600 m: 3:59.99 (Huntsville 2022); Mile: 4:03.12 (Seattle 2024); 3000 m: 7:50.05 (Seattle 2025); 3200 m: 8:35.72 (Arcadia 2022); 5000 m: 13:34.96 (Los Angeles 2023); 10,000 m: 27:48.93 (Azusa 2025)
Medal record
Men's athletics
Representing United States

Alexio Randolph Young (born February 28, 2005) is an American long distance runner who competes for Stanford University.

At the age of 18, running for Newbury Park High School, he broke the national high school 5000m record with a time of 13:34.96 at the USATF Los Angeles Grand Prix. While at Newbury Park he won four California cross-country state team titles. In 2022, Lex was the individual D2 State Champion.

He is the twin brother of Leo Young and younger brother of Nico Young, who competed at Northern Arizona University and is an Olympian in the 10,000 meters.

== High school ==
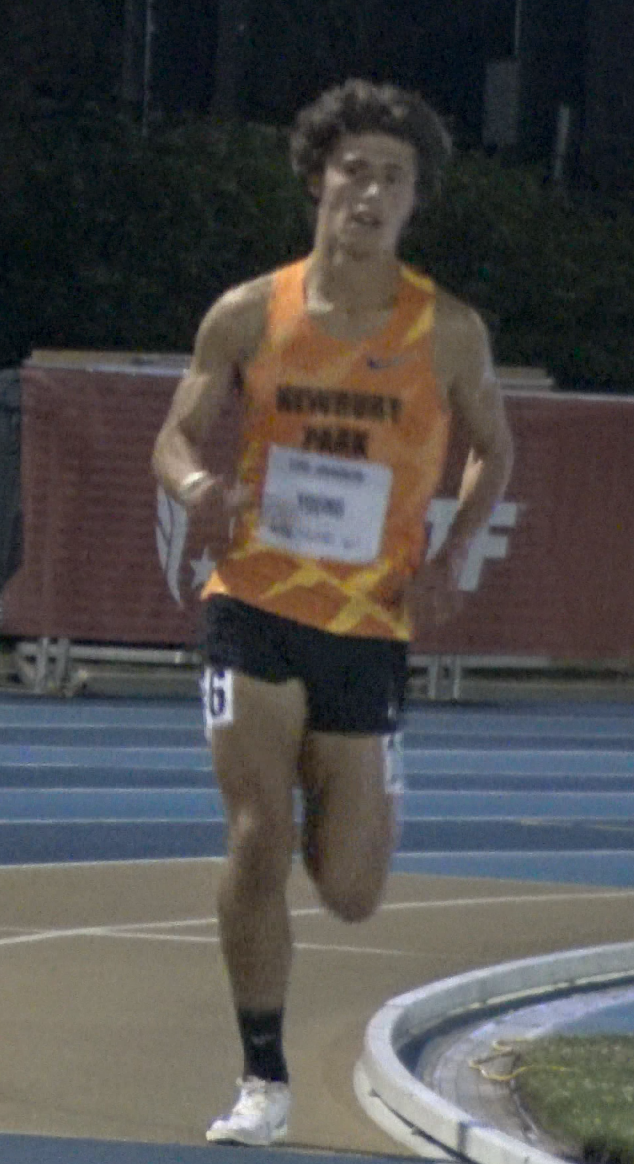
Lex Young setting National High School Record 5,000m

Lex Young ran for Newbury Park all four years of high school. While he was on the team, they won four California cross-country state team titles. The team set multiple high school records with Lex individually breaking the USA national high school 5,000m record at the USATF Los Angeles Grand Prix.

During Young's junior year, the Nike Cross Nationals was cancelled due to the COVID-19 pandemic. The Garmin RunningLane race in Huntsville, Alabama became the de facto National Championships. Lex finished third with a time of 14:05.59, behind his brother Leo and teammate Colin Sahlman, who won in a new high school record of 14:03.29. All three were under Dathan Ritzenhein's previous cross country 5 kilometer record of 14:10. Two other Newbury Park athletes finished 6th and 42nd, with the five-man average at 14:14. Newbury Park is often referred to as the greatest high school cross-country team of all time.

Three months later, Lex was part of a Newbury Park relay team that set a new high school national 4x1 mile record. Their time of 16:29.31 took 32 1/2 seconds off the previous mark. In May 2022, Lex ran 13:43.95 in the 5000 meter at the Sound Running Track Meet, setting a national junior class record.

In August 2022, Lex and his brother Leo announced via their YouTube channel that they would be committing to Stanford University.

During the 2022 cross-country season, Newbury Park repeated as national champions at the 2022 Nike Cross Nationals, with the team scoring 66 points. Lex later broke the national high school 5000 meter record, running a time of 13:34.96 at the USATF Los Angeles Grand Prix. In February, he ran 7:57.06 to run the second fastest 3000 meters ever by a high schooler, only behind his older brother Nico Young. Lex also ran an 8:43.93 3200 meters for the ninth-fastest high school time ever.

== Collegiate career ==
As a freshman at Stanford, Young advanced to the NCAA West Prelims and was highest placing American true-freshman at the meeting. He ran personal bests in the 10,000 meters and the 3000 meters during his freshman year.

Representing Stanford University '23-'27
Year	Venue	Position	Event	Time
Cross Country Championships
2023 Pac-12 Conference Cross Country Championship	University Place, Washington	12th	8 km	23:17.5
2023 NCAA Division I cross country championships	Charlottesville, Virginia	74th	10 km	30:19.5
2024 Atlantic Coast Conference Cross Country Championship	Cary, North Carolina	11th	8 km	22:49.4
2024 NCAA Division I cross country championships	Madison, Wisconsin	63rd	10 km	29:38.7
Indoor Track and Field Championships
2025 Atlantic Coast Conference Indoor Track and Field Championships	Louisville, Kentucky	7th	3000 m	7:53.06
2025 Atlantic Coast Conference Indoor Track and Field Championships	Louisville, Kentucky	6th	5000 m	13:40.31
Outdoor Track and Field Championships
2024 Pac-12 Conference Outdoor Track and Field Championships	Boulder, Colorado	10th	5000 m	14:42.97
2024 Pac-12 Conference Outdoor Track and Field Championships	Boulder, Colorado	6th	10,000 m	29:51.99
2025 Atlantic Coast Conference Outdoor Track and Field Championships	Winston-Salem, North Carolina	2nd	10,000 m	28:55.29

== Personal life ==
Young and his twin brother Leo are YouTube vloggers, under the handle L&L.
