= Molly Haywood =

American athlete (born 2005)

Personal information
- Born: 15 March 2005 (age 21)

Sport
- Sport: Athletics
- Event: Pole Vault

Achievements and titles
- Personal best(s): Pole Vault: 4.61m (Lubbock, 2025)
Medal record
Women's athletics
Representing United States
World U20 Championships
Gold medal – first place	2024 Lima	Pole vault

Molly Haywood (born 15 March 2005) is an American pole vaulter. She won the gold medal at the 2024 World Athletics U20 Championships.

== Early life ==
From Texas, she attended Tomball Memorial High School. As a youngster she competed in American Ninja Warrior.

== Career ==
Competing for Baylor University she finished ninth in the final of the 2024 NCAA Indoor Championships in Boston, Massachusetts.

In June 2024, she won the silver medal at the USA U20 championships in the pole vault. That month, she finished fifth in the pole vault at the NCAA Outdoor Championships.

She won the gold medal representing the United States at the World Athletics U20 Championships in Lima, Peru. She entered the competition at 4.15 metres and ultimately cleared 4.47 metres.

In March 2025, she set a new personal best height of 4.61 metres to win the Big 12 Indoor Track and Field Championships in Lubbock, Texas. In May 2025, she cleared a height of 4.52 metres to win her second consecutive title at the Big 12 Conference, in Lawrence, Kansas.

Haywood qualified for the 2026 NCAA Division I Indoor Track and Field Championships, placing fourth overall with a clearance of 4.56 metres. In June, she qualified for the 2026 NCAA Outdoor Championships, placing fifth overall.
