= Shirley Wu =

Data scientist

- Education: University of California, Berkeley
- Known for: Data visualizations
- Website: https://shirleywu.studio/

Shirley Wu is a data scientist specialized in data art and data visualizations. She is a freelancer based out of San Francisco, California. With Nadieh Bremer, Wu is the author of Data Sketches.

== Education ==
Shirley Wu graduated from Newbury Park High School in Newbury Park, California in 2008. Wu received her Business Administration degree at the University of California, Berkeley in 2012. In Fall 2021, she began a master's degree at the New York University Tisch School of the Arts's Interactive Telecommunications Program.

== Career ==
In 2012, Wu worked as a software engineer at Splunk. Wu then worked as a software engineer on a frontend team at Illumio in 2015.

Since 2016, Wu has freelanced as a data visualization contractor and consultant. Wu writes, teaches, and speaks at conferences about her data art and visualization expertise, as well as providing courses on front-end web development, particularly D3. As a data visualization expert, she is a frequent speaker at conferences and guest on data visualization podcasts.

Wu has had an ongoing collaboration with Nadieh Bremer since they met in 2016 at the OpenVisConf in Boston. In late 2017, Wu and Bremer collaborated with The Guardian to enrich the field of journalism research in the project "Bussed Out: How America Moves its Homeless". This article's cartographic and visual works seamlessly accompanying its storytelling received various accolades and awards. The pair have collaborated with Google and Alberto Cairo on visualizations about popular travel locations and searches. Wu's work focused on the search terms entered from one country that were related to other countries. Bremer and Wu have also co-authored the book Data Sketches together. The book was first suggested by Tamara Munzner, who wanted the book to be part of her data visualization series. Munzner joined the project as its editor.

As a result of her work, Wu was featured in GitHub's ReadME Project, which "amplifies the voices of the open source community."

== Notable works ==
- Data Sketches (2021), coauthored with Nadieh Bremer, is a collection of 24 data visualizations.
  - An Interactive Visualization of Every Line in Hamilton, The Pudding (part of the Data Sketches series). An interactive data visualization of the dialogue in the musical Hamilton.
  - Explore Adventure, Google News Lab (part of the Data Sketches series). The visualization explores how Google searches differ between countries. In 2017, it received the Science & Technology award given by Information is Beautiful Awards.
- People of the Pandemic: an interactive simulation game. This piece allows readers to localize a simulation of the COVID-19 pandemic, to make the impacts of decisions more intuitive.
- Bussed Out: How America Moves its Homeless, The Guardian This piece won best data visualization from the North American Digital Media Awards, as well as Silver from the Malofiej Awards.

== Awards ==
- Best Data Visualization – North American Digital Media Awards (2018) for "Bussed Out: How America Moves its Homeless".
- Silver in Features – Malofiej 26 (2018) for "Bussed Out: How America Moves its Homeless".
- Bronze in Art, Entertainment & Pop Culture – Information is Beautiful Awards (2017) for "An Interactive Visualization of Every Line in Hamilton".
- Gold in Unusual – Information is Beautiful Awards (2017) for "Data Sketches in Twelve Installments".
