= Nadieh Bremer =

Data scientist and data visualization designer

- Education: University of California, Berkeley (MS); Leiden University (MS)
- Known for: Data visualization
- Awards: Information is Beautiful Award, 2016, 2017, 2018; North American Digital Media Award, 2018
- Website: visualcinnamon.com

Nadieh Bremer is a data scientist and data visualization designer. She is based out of a small town outside of Amsterdam.

== Education ==
Bremer graduated cum laude from Leiden University with Masters of Science in Astronomy. She also attended University of California, Berkeley.

== Career ==
Early in her career, Bremer worked as a Senior Consultant of Advanced Analytics and Data Visualizations at Deloitte. She is currently a freelance data designer under the name "Visual Cinnamon," working with small startups to provide custom visualizations of their data.

== Publications ==
Her work has been published in The Washington Post, Bloomberg CityLab, Scientific American, The Week, and DigitalArts, among others.

She co-authored Data Sketches with Shirley Wu in February 2021.

== Awards ==
- "Politics & Global", Gold - Information is Beautiful Awards (2018)
- Best Data Visualization - North American Digital Media Awards (2018)
- Best Investigative Data Journalism - Online Journalism Awards (2018)
- Best Individual - Information is Beautiful Awards (2017)
- "Unusual", Gold - Information is Beautiful Awards (2017)
- "Science & Tech", Silver - Information is Beautiful Awards (2017)
- Rising Star - Information is Beautiful Awards (2016)
