= Amanda Moll =

American athlete (born 2005)

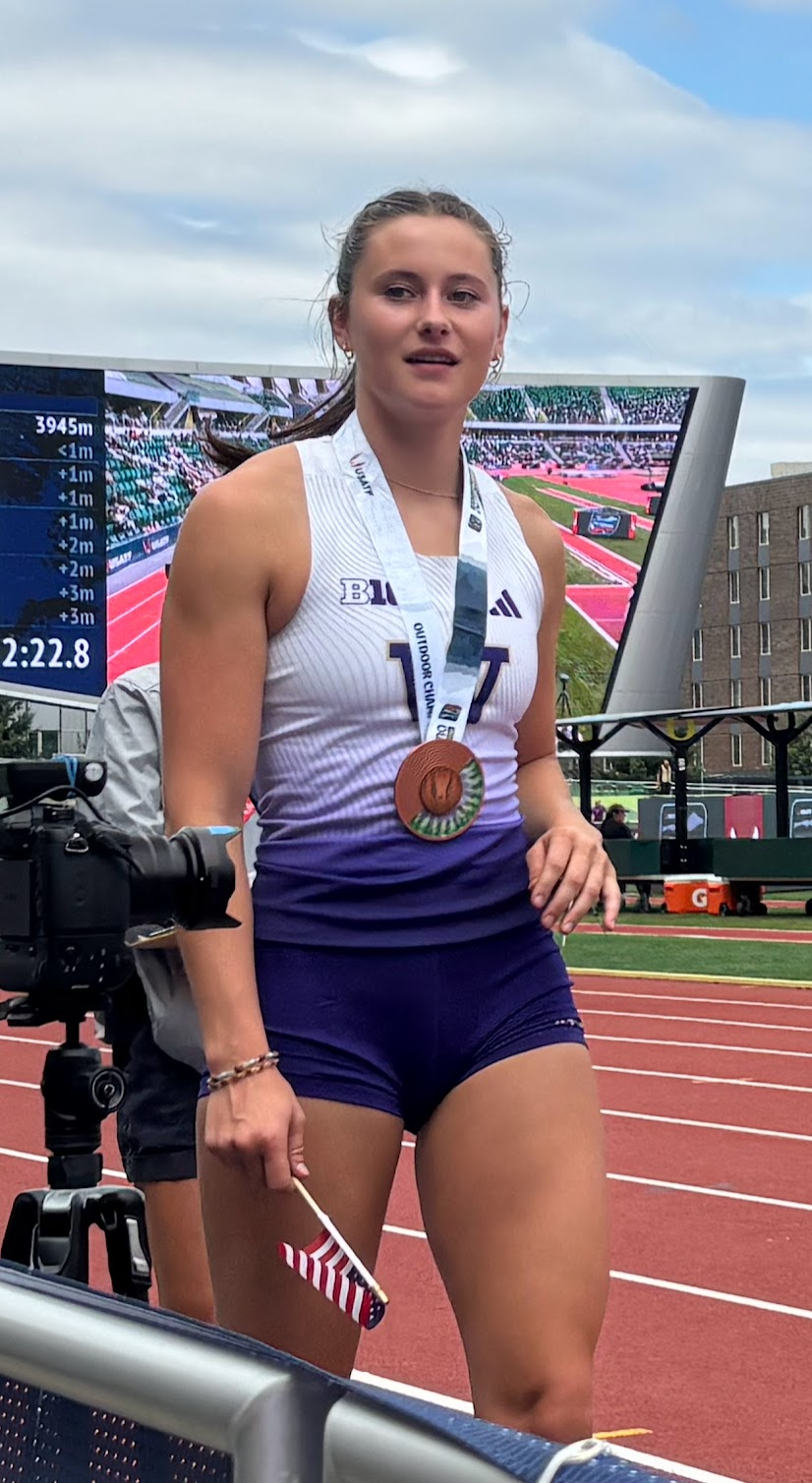
- Moll at the 2025 USA Outdoor Track and Field Championships

Personal information
- Nationality: American
- Born: January 31, 2005 (age 21) Olympia, Washington, United States

Sport
- Sport: Track and field
- Event: Pole vault
- University team: Washington Huskies

Achievements and titles
- Personal bests: Pole Vault: 4.91m (Indianapolis, 2025)

Amanda Moll (born January 31, 2005) is an American pole vaulter. She holds the indoor world under-18 best, the NCAA record, the American youth record and high school all-time record in the pole vault.

Her twin sister Hana Moll is also a pole vaulter and won the 2022 World Junior Championships. The pair finished tied for sixth overall competing for the United States at the senior 2025 World Athletics Championships in Tokyo.

== Biography ==
She is a member of the Northwest Pole Vault Club. She set an indoor world under-18 best with a 4.50 metres clearance on February 27, 2022, at the USA Championships in Spokane, Washington. She finished fifth at the 2022 IAAF World Junior Championships in Cali, Colombia in August 2022.

In January 2023, she set an American Under-20 record and high school all-time record clearance of 4.61m competing at the 2023 Pole Vault Summit in Reno, Nevada, becoming the first American girl to go over 15 feet. Later in the year, she had to recover after slipping off of her pole at the Clyde Littlefield Texas Relays in March 2023, meaning she missed the high school national championships in June 2023.

She qualified for the final at the US Olympic Trials in Eugene, Oregon in June 2024, before placing fifth overall with a personal best clearance of 4.63 metres. She set a new personal best of 4.65 metres in Reno at the Pole Vault Summit in January 2025. She set a new Collegiate record of 4.91 metres in Indianapolis on 1 March 2025. She won the NCAA Championship indoor title on 14 March 2025 in Virginia Beach.

She cleared 4.73 metres to place third at the 2025 USA Outdoor Track and Field Championships in Eugene on count-back after clearing the same height as sister Hana Moll in fourth and Katie Moon in second. She was subsequently selected to make her senior debut for the United States in Japan, alongside her twin sister, at the 2025 World Athletics Championships in Tokyo, Japan, in September 2025 with both qualifying for the final and clearing 4.65 metres to place in equal sixth place overall.

After suffering a concussion which brought an early conclusion to her 2026 indoor season, Moll placed second behind her sister at the Big Ten Outdoor Conference final. On 11 June, Moll reversed the order by winning the 2026 NCAA Outdoor Championships in Eugene. In doing so, and cleared 4.84m to break Hana's collegiate outdoor record from the Big Ten Championships.

On 10 July, Moll finished as runner-up to Nina Kennedy at the 2026 Diamond League event in Monaco.

== Personal life ==
Moll and her twin sister Hana were born in Olympia, Washington, and attended Capital High School before moving to the University of Washington. She participated in gymnastics, rock climbing, and mountain biking before focusing on athletics. Her mother, Paula, is a dietician, and her father, Eric, the CEO of a healthcare company. Her twin sister Hana is also a pole vaulter.
