= Kitty Friele Faye =

Norwegian pole vaulter (born 2002)

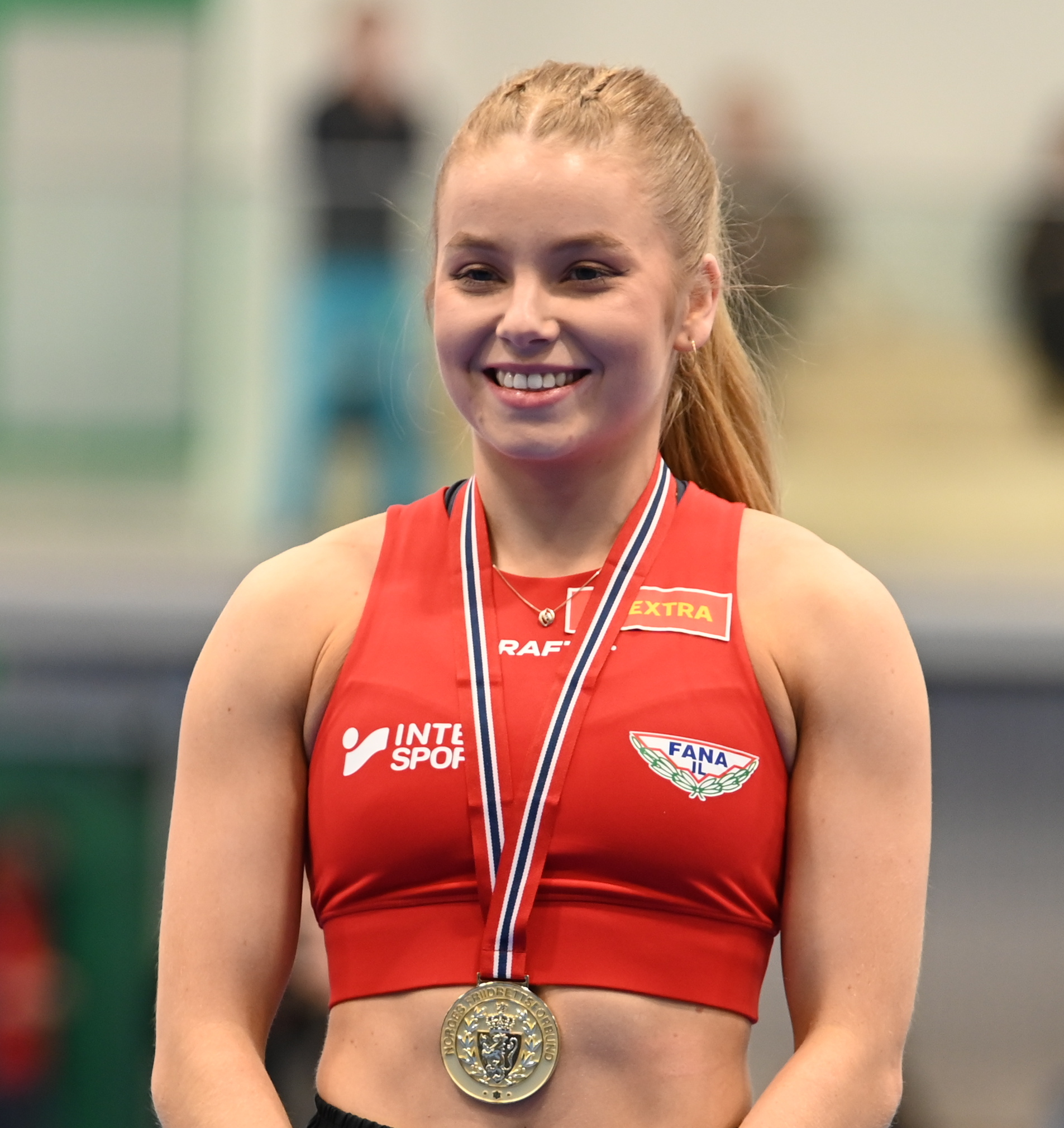
- Faye in 2026

Personal information
- Full name: Kitty Augusta Friele Faye
- Born: 17 August 2002 (age 24)

Sport
- Sport: Athletics
- Event: Pole vault

Achievements and titles
- Personal bests: Pole vault: 4.65m (Aachen, 2026)
Medal record
Women's athletics
Representing Norway
Summer World University Games
Silver medal – second place	2025 Bochum	Pole vault
European U23 Championships
Bronze medal – third place	2023 Espoo	Pole Vault

Kitty Augusta Friele Faye (born 17 August 2002) is a Norwegian pole vaulter. She was a silver medalist at the 2025 World University Games and represented Norway at the 2025 World Athletics Championships.

== Biography ==
From Bergen, she is a member of Fana IL Athletics club where her father Didrik Friele Faye is head of athletics.

She was a bronze medalist at the 2023 European Athletics U23 Championships in Espoo, Finland with a clearance of 4.40 metres, to finish third behind Frenchwoman Marie-Julie Bonnin and Belgian Elien Vekemans.

She won the silver medal at the 2025 Summer World University Games in Bochum, Germany with a 4.50 metres clearance. She competed at the 2025 World Athletics Championships in Tokyo, Japan, in September 2025, without advancing to the final.

She won the pole vault competition at the Fana stavhoppgalla, a World Athletics Indoor Tour Challenger meeting in Bergen, on 3 January 2026, defending her title from the previous year, winning on countback from Hanga Klekner. In June 2026, she cleared 4.60m to win on the World Athletics Continental Tour in Hof, Bavaria. In August, she competed at the 2026 European Athletics Championships in Birmingham, England.
