= Magdalena Rauter =

Austrian athlete (born 2006)

Personal information
- Nationality: Austrian
- Born: 3 July 2006 (age 20)

Sport
- Sport: Athletics
- Event: Pole Vault

Achievements and titles
- Personal best: Pole Vault: 4.20m (2024)
Medal record
Women's athletics
Representing Austria
World U20 Championships
Silver medal – second place	2024 Lima	Pole vault
European Youth Olympic Festival
Gold medal – first place	2023 Maribor	Pole vault

Magdalena Rauter (born 3 July 2006) is an Austrian pole vaulter. She became Austrian national champion in 2023. She won the silver medal at the 2024 World Athletics U20 Championships.

== Career ==
She competed in multi-events before focusing on pole vault in 2019. As a 15-year-old she cleared a height of 3.80 metres at the Austrian Championships in June 2021, finishing runner-up in the senior championships. Indoors the previous winter, she cleared 3.62 metres. Both marks were Austrian national U16 records.

She won the senior Austrian title for the first time in July 2023 in Bregenz, with a clearance of 4.93 metres.

She won gold in the pole vault at the 2023 European Youth Summer Olympic Festival in Maribor in July 2023. A photograph of her vaulting taking by Patrick Steiner was named the winner of a Games-long competition photography competition.

In May 2024, she came third in Innsbruck in the pole vault Golden Roof Challenge. In July 2024, she set a new Austrian U20 national record height of 4.20 metres competing in Rottach-Egern.

She won the silver medal at the World Athletics U20 Championships in Lima, Peru in August 2024, clearing 4.15 metres.

== Personal life ==
She is from Götzens. Both her parents were successful snowboarders, with her mother Christine world champion in parallel slalom.
