= Sophie Ashurst =

British athlete (born 2003)

Personal information
- Nationality: British
- Born: 26 April 2003 (age 23)

Sport
- Sport: Athletics
- Event: Pole vault

Achievements and titles
- Personal best: Pole vault: 4.35m (2024)

Sophie Ashurst (born 26 April 2003) is a British pole vaulter.

== Early and personal life ==
From Sale, Greater Manchester, she is the daughter of pole vaulter Andy Ashurst. She first tried the pole vault with her father when she was eight years-old. She played numerous sports before focusing on athletics by the age of 16 years-old. She won the English schools senior girls pole vault title in July 2021 with a championship record clearance of 4.21m. She later attended Loughborough University where she began to be coached by Kate Rooney.

== Career ==
She won the national under-20 pole vault title in 2021 with a 4.10m clearance and set a new English Schools Championship best performance of 4.21m. She placed fifth at the 2021 European Athletics U20 Championships and sixth in the senior 2021 British Athletics Championships. She was troubled by a hip flexor injury in 2022 but later in the summer also finished sixth in the pole vault at the 2022 World Athletics U20 Championships in Cali, Colombia with a clearance of 4.10 metres, and was given the honour of captaining the British squad at the championships.

She was runner-up at the 2024 British Universities and Colleges Sport (BUCS) indoor championships in Sheffield in February 2024. She cleared 4.21 metres to place third at the 2024 British Athletics Championships. That year, she set a new personal best with a clearance of 4.35 metres whilst competing in France.

In November 2024, she was named by British Athletics on the Olympic Futures Programme for 2025. She was runner-up at the 2025 British Indoor Athletics Championships, in Birmingham, on 22 February 2025, to Nemiah Munir. She was runner-up to Munir again at the BUCS outdoor championships in May 2025.
