= Nayah Cauvin =

French athlete (born 2004)

Personal information
- Nationality: French
- Born: 29 March 2004 (age 22)

Sport
- Sport: Athletics
- Event: Pole vault

Achievements and titles
- Personal best: Pole vault: 4.54m (2026)

Nayah Cauvin (born 25 March 2004) is a French pole vaulter. She is a two-time runner-up at the French Indoor Athletics Championships.

== Biography ==
From Mondeville, Essonne, Cauvin has been coached from junior athletics by Franck Clotet since 2016 having transitioned from gymnastics. She trains as a remember of EA Mondeville-Hérouville. In 2021, as a seventeen year-old, she won the age-group French indoor championships in the pole vault with a personal best 3.88m, and placed second at the age-group outdoor championships in Essonne with a clearance of 3.70 metres. She won the French age-group title again in 2023 and that year was runner-up at the French University Championships, representing the University of Caen Normandy.

In February 2025, Cauvin cleared 4.36 metres to finish as runner-up to Marie-Julie Bonnin at the French Indoor Athletics Championships. Cauvin placed fifth in her international debut representing France at the 2025 European Athletics U23 Championships in Bergen, Norway, with a clearance of 4.30 metres.

She set a new personal best of 4.40 metres in January 2026 at the Perch'Xtrem in Caen. In February 2026, Cauvin won another French age-group title, and then cleared 4.54 metres to finish as runner-up to Bonnin again at the senior French Indoor Championships, a height which moved her to fourth on the French all-time U23 list.
