= Zangle =

Student information system

Zangle is a student information system for schools and school districts to allow teachers to record students' academic progress in classes and for parents and students to check their grades, find assignments that will be due in the future, find past-due assignments, pay fees, as well as other information. The system features many modules that record various student data such as attendance, academic history, behavior and so on. It is popular among schools across the United States, and a bit in other locations. The system uses the Microsoft SQL database engine for data storage.

== Ownership ==
Zangle is a copyright of a company by the name Aequitas Solutions, Inc. Zangle was developed by a company named "C Innovation" that was acquired by Aequitas Solutions.
