= Hana Moll =

American athlete

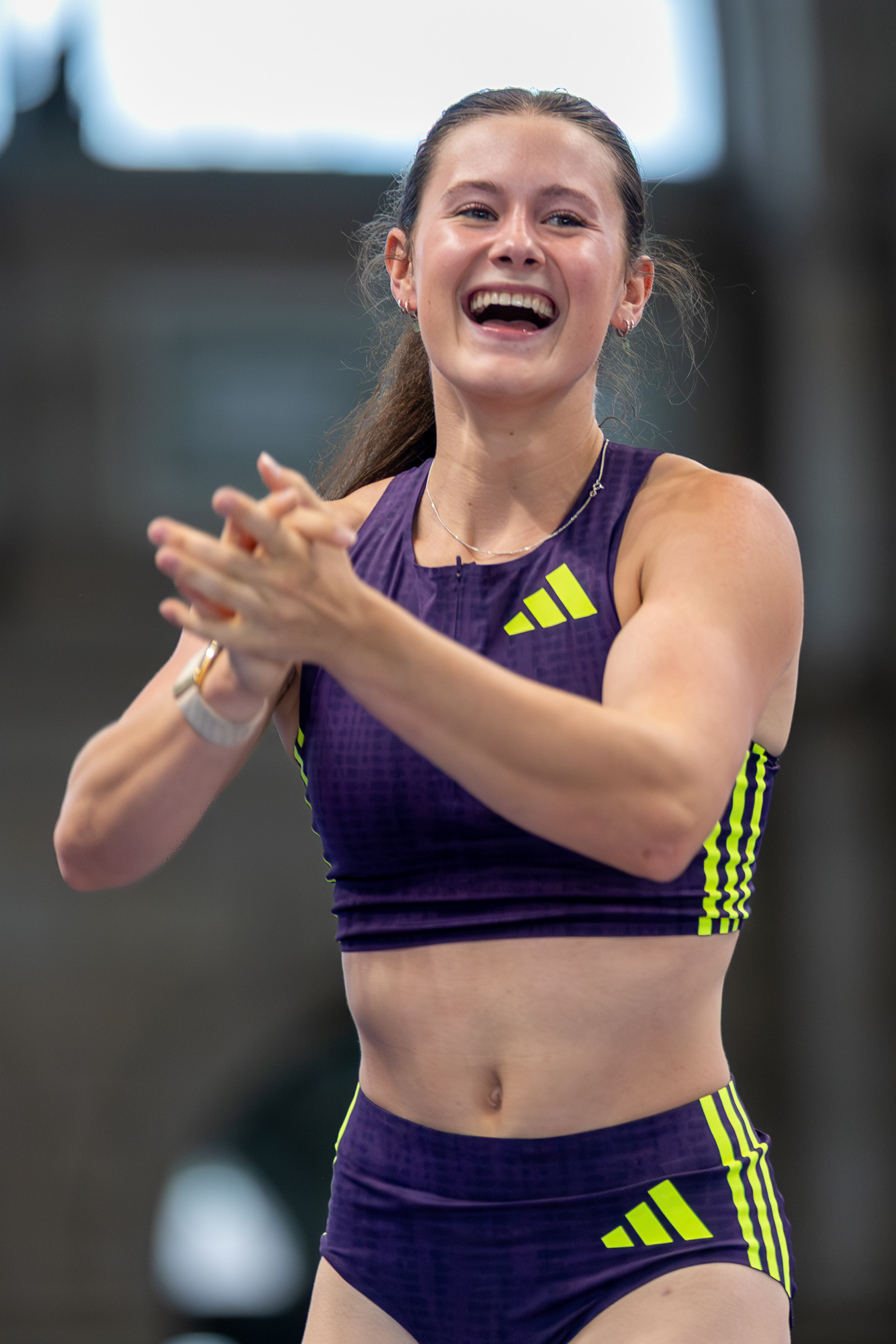
- Moll after winning the 2026 Weltklasse Zürich

Personal information
- Nationality: American
- Born: January 31, 2005 (age 21) Olympia, Washington, United States

Sport
- Sport: Track and field
- Event: Pole vault
- University team: Washington Huskies

Achievements and titles
- Personal bests: Pole Vault: 4.91m (Brussels, 2026)
Medal record
Women's athletics
Representing United States
World Ultimate Championship
Second place	2026 Budapest	Pole vault
Diamond League
First place	2026	Pole vault
World U20 Championships
Gold medal – first place	2022 Cali	Pole vault

Hana Moll (born January 31, 2005) is an American track and field athlete who competes in pole vault. She won the 2022 IAAF World Junior Championships, the 2025 NCAA Outdoor Championships, and the 2026 Diamond League Final.

Her twin sister Amanda Moll is also a pole vaulter, and the pair finished tied for sixth overall competing at the senior 2025 World Athletics Championships in Tokyo.

== Early and personal life ==
Moll was born in Olympia, Washington, with her twin sister Amanda. They both attended Capital High School in Olympia and the University of Washington. Amanda is also a competitor in pole vault and set a world under-18 best, and a world leading junior height going into the 2022 World Junior Championships in which she finished fifth. Their parents are Eric and Paula Moll.

== Career ==
Twice in January 2022, Moll broke her personal best, first at the Texas Elite Pole Vault EXPO Explosion on January 1, 2022, and second as she won the age group category at the 2022 Pole Vault Summit in Reno, Nevada. She cleared 4.47m with her twin sister Amanda finishing second in the event. Both twins were coached by Mike Strong in high school in Olympia, Washington and by Tim Reilly, NW Pole Vault. Moll won the gold medal at the 2022 IAAF World Junior Championships in Cali, Colombia, clearing 4.35m on the day.

In February 2023, while still a high-schooler, she consisted fifth at the US National Indoor Championship, held in Albuquerque, New Mexico. In July 2023, Moll set a new personal best, clearing 4.61m in Eugene, Oregon whilst finishing third at the 2023 USA Outdoor Track and Field Championships. It was a new national high-school record. She was selected for the 2023 World Athletics Championships in Budapest in August 2023. She qualified for the final with a personal best clearance of 4.65 meters.

Competing at the 2024 NCAA Indoor Championships in Boston, Massachusetts, she won the pole vault title with a height of 4.60m. She qualified for the final at the US Olympic Trials in June 2024, before placing sixth overall with a clearance of 4.63 metres.

She set a personal best 4.81 metres in Indianapolis on 1 March 2025 to move to second on the all-time collegiate list, behind only her twin sister Amanda. She finished second at the NCAA Indoor Championship on 14 March 2025 in Virginia Beach, behind her sister Amanda on countback. She cleared 4.79 to set a new meeting record at the 2025 NCAA Outdoor Championships in Eugene, Oregon in June 2025. She was named women's field athlete of the year at the 2025 NCAA Division I Outdoor Track & Field National Awards.

She cleared 4.73 metres to place fourth at the 2025 USA Outdoor Track and Field Championships in Eugene on count-back after clearing the same height as sister Amanda and Katie Moon. With Moon receiving a wildcard as reigning world champion for the upcoming Tokyo World Championships both twins were guaranteed to make their first senior appearance together for the United States in Japan, fitness permitting. She cleared 4.74 metres to place third in the 2025 Diamond League event, the 2025 Memorial Van Damme in Brussels, Belgium, behind Katie Moon and Molly Caudery. She was a finalist at the 2025 World Athletics Championships in Tokyo, Japan, in September 2025, placing sixth in a tie with her sister Amanda, with both clearing 4.65 metres.

In January 2026, Moll cleared 4.88 metres in Seattle, to join her sister Amanda as the only two collegians to clear a height of 16 feet. Competing at the Big Ten Indoor Championships Moll won the pole vault with a clearance of 4.60m in February 2026. The following month, she cleared 4.82 metres to win the 2026 NCAA Indoor Championships, breaking her sister's meeting record from the previous year.

Hana Moll set another NCAA record at the 2026 Mt. SAC Relays, where she cleared 4.80 meters to win.

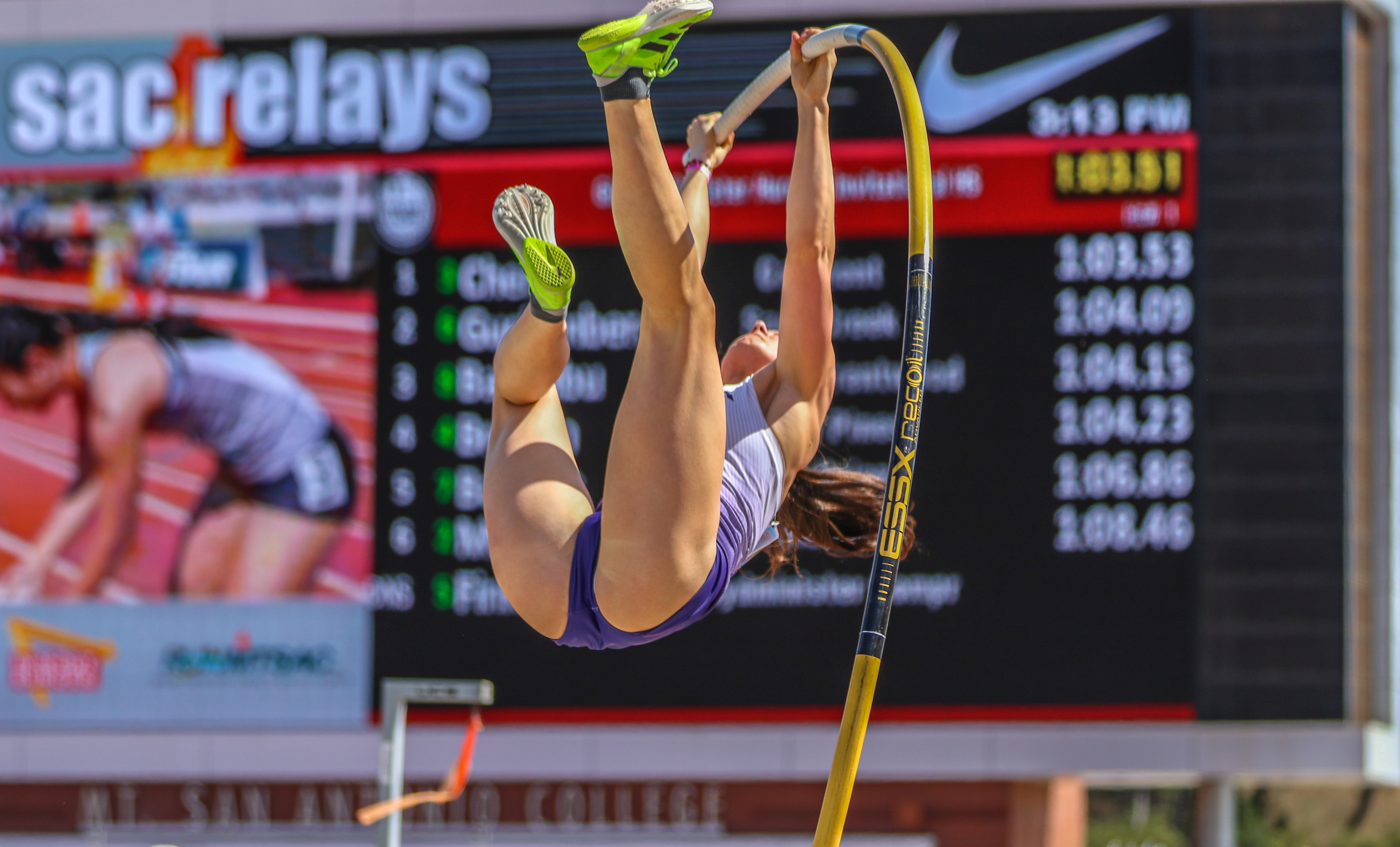
Hana Moll’s college record vault at 2026 Mt SAC Relays

In May, Moll broke her own outdoor collegiate record and her sister's meet record with a clearance of 4.83 metres at the Big Ten Championships. On 11 June, the order was reversed as she placed second behind her sister at the 2026 NCAA Outdoor Championships in Eugene, as Amanda cleared 4.84m to break Hana's collegiate outdoor record from the Big Ten Championships. In July, she cleared 4.70 metres to place joint-fourth at the 2026 Prefontaine Classic. Competing at the 2026 Athletissima in Lausanne on 21 August, Moll cleared 4.84m on her final attempt to get her first Diamond League victory, winning ahead of home athlete Angelica Moser. She won her second Diamond League event in a week, clearing a personal best 4.90 metres to win on 26 August at the 2026 Weltklasse Zürich. At the 2026 Diamond League Final in Brussels on 5 September, she won her third event in as many weeks, clearing a new personal best of 4.91 metres. On 12 September, she placed second to Sandi Morris at the 2026 World Ultimate Championship on countback after they both cleared 4.90 metres.
