= Marijn Kieft =

Dutch athlete (born 2006)

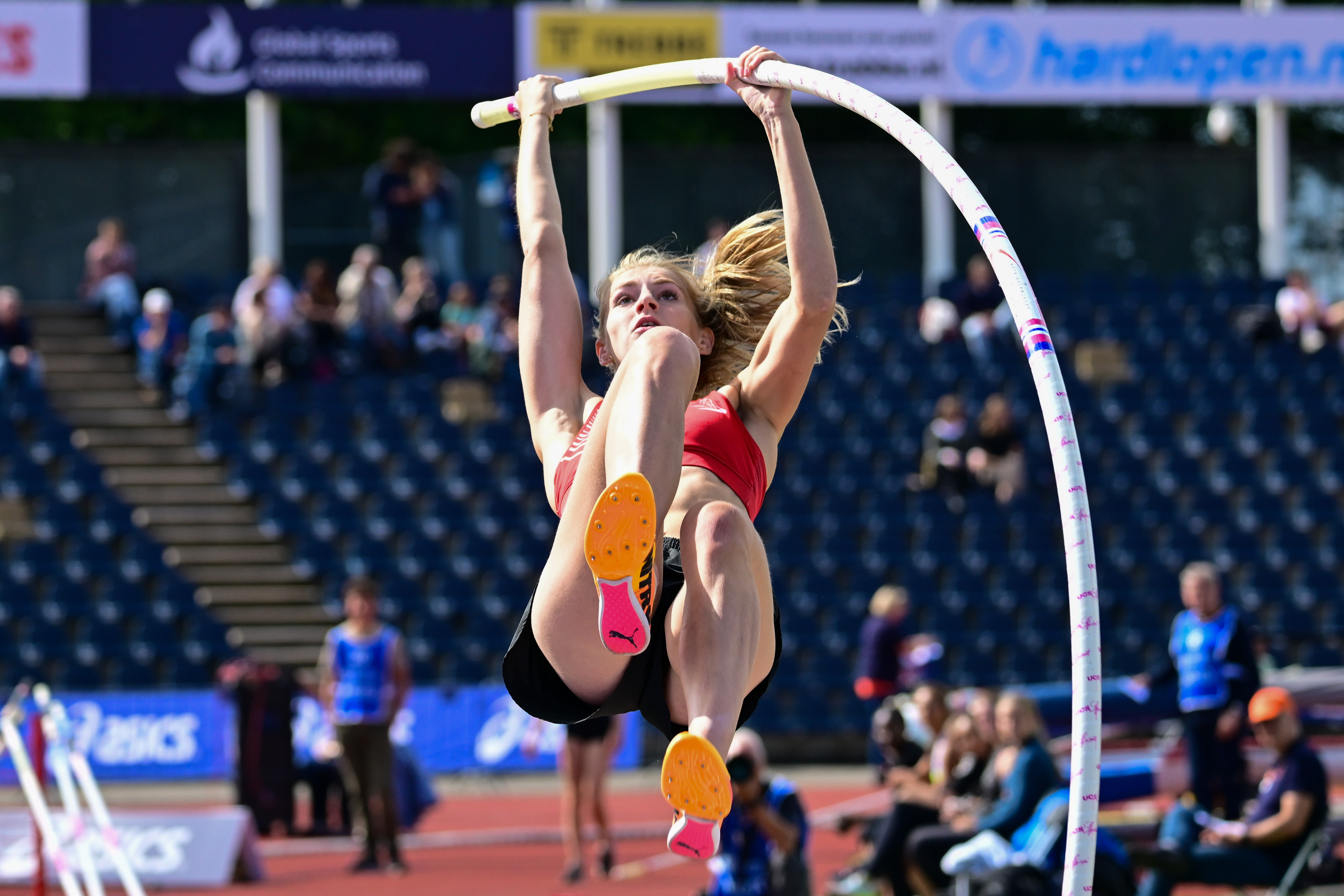
- Marijn Kieft, 2025 Dutch Championships, Hengelo, The Netherlands.

Personal information
- Born: 29 August 2006 (age 19)

Sport
- Sport: Athletics
- Event: Pole vault

Achievements and titles
- Personal bests: Pole vault: 4.60 m (Zoetermeer, 2026) NR
Medal record
Women's athletics
Representing Netherlands
European U20 Championships
Silver medal – second place	2025 Tampere	Pole vault

Marijn Kieft (born 29 August 2006) is a Dutch pole vaulter and multi-event athlete. She became the senior Dutch champion in 2025, winning the pole vault national titles both indoors and outdoors before retaining both titles the following year. She became Dutch national record holder in January 2026.

== Biography ==
From Alphen aan den Rijn, she started in athletics at the age of seven years-old. She competes as a member of the athletics club AAV'36.

=== 2024 ===
In June 2024, she won the heptathlon at the Dutch U20 Combined Events Championships with her efforts including personal best of over half a metre in the shot put (10.75m), a 200 metres personal best of 25.91 seconds, a personal best of 5.77m in the long jump and a personal best for the 800 metres of 2:22.34 and scored 5,101 points for the pentathlon overall. That month, she set a new personal best and Dutch under-20 indoor record of 4.26 metres for the pole vault. This height also earned her selection for the 2024 World Athletics U20 Championships in Lima, Peru, but she ultimately did not proceed past the preliminary groups in Peru.

=== 2025 ===
In February 2025, she won the pentathlon at the Dutch U20 Indoor Combined Events Championships. She won her first senior national title at the Dutch Indoor Athletics Championships in the pole vault in Apeldoorn that month, having made a successful clearance of 4.35 metres. Later that year, she increased her personal best for the pole vault to 4.47 metres.

She won her first outdoor senior national title at the Dutch Athletics Championships in Hengelo in August 2025, setting a new Dutch under-20 record of 4.51 metres to break the mark set earlier that year by Elise de Jong. Later that month, she won her first international championship medal in the pole vault at the 2025 European Athletics U20 Championships in Tampere, Finland, finishing in second place overall behind de Jong, with a successful clearance of 4.40 metres.

=== 2026 ===
Kieft set a new personal best and Dutch outright national record of 4.60 metres in Zoetermeer in January 2026. On 28 February, she cleared 4.40 metres to retain her national title at the Dutch Indoor Athletics Championships. In July 2026, she retained her Dutch title at the outdoor national championships, her clearance of 4.56 meters set a new Dutch outdoor record, 1cm higher than the previous best set by Femke Pluim in 2015. In August, she competed at the 2026 European Athletics Championships in Birmingham, England.
