= Melanie Doggett =

American sprinter

Personal information
- Born: 2011 or 2012 (age 14–15)

Sport
- Sport: Athletics
- Event: Sprint

Achievements and titles
- Personal bests: 60m: 7.17 (2025); 100m: 11.01 (2026); 200m: 22.48 (2026)

Melanie Doggett is an American sprinter from Georgia. As a teenager she set world age-group best times in the 60 metres, 100 metres and 200 metres.

== Career ==
Doggett is from Fairburn, Georgia and attends Landmark Christian School. She showed aptitude for sprinting at a young-age, winning the 100 metres national title in the USATF's 8-and-under division. At age 9, she set an age-group world record in the 200 metres with a time of 26.08 seconds.

As a 12 year-old in 2024, Doggett ran 11.67 seconds for the 100 meters at the Adidas Outdoor Nationals. That time not only broke the previous world record for 12-year-olds but also surpassed the sixth-grade world best set by Tamari Davis. At the Millrose Games in New York in February 2025, she ran the 60 metres dash in 7.17 seconds, breaking her own age-13 world record.

Later that year, Doggett broke the U13 world record in the 100 meters with a time of 11.53 seconds. In July 2025, Doggett became the second-fastest 14-year-old in the 200-meter dash at the USA Track and Field National Junior Olympics in Savannah, running 22.94 seconds, breaking her own meet record set the previous day. Also running 54.96 for the 400 metres in 2025, she signed a Name, Image and Likeness (NIL) contract with sportswear brand Nike.

Competing over 100 metres at the Bill Thorn Invitational 2026 on Saturday 18 April 2026 as a 14-year-old, Doggett moved to within 0.03 seconds of Candace Hill's women's world under-18 record in Fairburn, Georgia, running 11.01 seconds. In May 2026, Doggett ran a wind-legal 22.71s (+2.0) over 200m at the GHSA State Championships in Athens, Georgia. In June, she ran 11.18 seconds and 22.48 seconds to win the 100 metres and 200 metres double at the Nike Outdoor Nationals. She was subsequently named 2025-26 Gatorade National Girls Track and Field Player of the Year, the first high school freshman to receive the award.
