= Los Angeles Grand Prix =

Annual athletics meeting in California, US

USATF Los Angeles Grand Prix
- Dates: May
- Host city: Los Angeles, California, United States
- Venue: Drake Stadium, University of California, Los Angeles
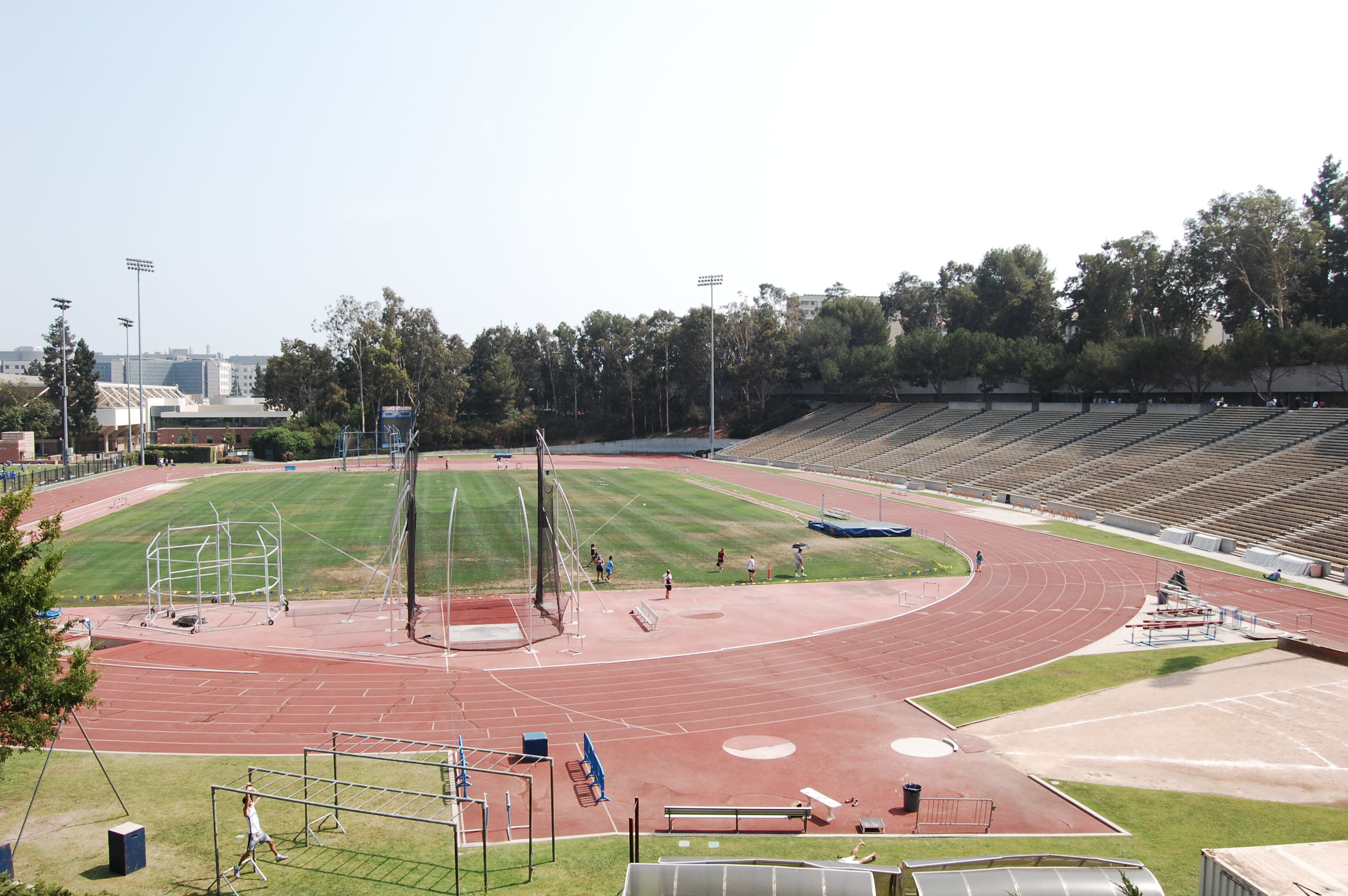
- Level: World Athletics Continental Tour Gold

The USATF Los Angeles Grand Prix is an annual track and field meeting held at the Drake Stadium track in Los Angeles. Founded in 2023, the meeting was designed to attract international athletics talent to the city in advance of the 2028 Summer Olympics. It is a World Athletics Continental Tour Gold level meeting – the second-highest level of athletics meetings behind the Diamond League.

The meeting is organized by USA Track and Field, and it ran concurrently with the USATF Legends Jam music festival. Its debut received mixed reception, hindered by the late withdrawal of several top athletes. USATF CEO Max Siegel noted that the meeting lost money, drawing a crowd of 4,500 to 7,249 people by different estimates.

At the inaugural edition, Ryan Crouser broke his shot put world record, throwing three of the six farthest marks of all time in his series. The meeting in 2025 was canceled.

== Editions ==
Los Angeles Grand Prix editions
Ed.	Name	Date	Musical headliner	Ref.
1st	2023 Los Angeles Grand Prix	26–27 May 2023	Judith Hill	
2nd	2024 Los Angeles Grand Prix	17–18 May 2024		
3rd	2026 Los Angeles Grand Prix	13–14 June 2026		

== Meeting records ==
Los Angeles Grand Prix meeting records
Event	Men				Women			
Event	Athlete	Mark	Date	Ref.	Athlete	Mark	Date	Ref.
100 m	Ackeem Blake (JAM)	9.89 (+1.0 m/s)	27 May 2023		Marie-Josee Ta Lou (CIV)	10.88 sf2 (+1.3 m/s)	27 May 2023	
200 m	Terrance Laird (USA)	20.06 (+0.7 m/s)	27 May 2023		Sydney McLaughlin-Levrone (USA)	22.07 (−0.3 m/s)	18 May 2024	
400 m	Sean Bailey (JAM)	44.43	27 May 2023		Marileidy Paulino (DOM)	48.98	27 May 2023	
800 m	Bryce Hoppel (USA)	1:43.68	18 May 2024		Halimah Nakaayi (UGA)	1:57.56	18 May 2024	
1500 m	Timothy Cheruiyot (KEN)	3:31.47	27 May 2023		Diribe Welteji (ETH)	3:55.25	18 May 2024	
5000 m	Selemon Barega (ETH)	12:51.60	17 May 2024		Elle Purrier St. Pierre (USA)	14:34.12	17 May 2024	
100 m hurdles	—N/a				Masai Russell (USA)	12.26 (+1.5 m/s)	14 June 2026	
400 m hurdles	Rai Benjamin (USA)	46.64	18 May 2024		Anna Cockrell (USA)	53.43	14 June 2026	
3000 m steeplechase	Jean-Simon Desgagnés (CAN)	8:16.49	17 May 2024		Gabrielle Jennings (USA)	9:11.72	14 June 2026	
Pole vault	Mondo Duplantis (SWE)	5.91 m	27 May 2023		Sandi Morris (USA)	4.70 m	17 May 2024	
Triple jump	—N/a				Thea LaFond (DMA)	14.37 m (±0.0 m/s)	18 May 2024	
Shot put	Ryan Crouser (USA)	23.56 m WR	27 May 2023		Maggie Ewen (USA)	20.53 m	14 June 2026	
Discus throw	Traves Smikle (JAM)	67.07 m	26 May 2023		Valarie Sion (USA)	68.39 m	14 June 2026	
Hammer throw	Mykhaylo Kokhan (UKR)	80.33 m	17 May 2024		Camryn Rogers (CAN)	78.62 m	26 May 2023	
Javelin throw	Anderson Peters (GRN)	83.16 m	27 May 2023		Xiaomei Sun (CHN)	55.67 m	27 May 2023	
