= Tyrese Cooper =

American track and field athlete

Personal information
- Nationality: United States
- Born: March 21, 2000 (age 26) Miami, Florida, U.S.
- Height: 6 ft 1 in (1.85 m)
- Weight: 175 lb (79 kg)

Sport
- Sport: Track and field
- Events: 100 metres, 200 metres, 400 metres

Tyrese Cooper (born March 21, 2000) is an American former track and field athlete who competed in sprinting events, specializing in the 100 metres, 200 metres, and 400 metres. He attended Miami Norland Senior High School in Miami Gardens, Florida.

In August 2016, Cooper ran new personal bests in the 100 metres, 200 metres, and 400 metres events. His 400 metres time of 45.23 seconds came within .09 seconds of Obea Moore's World Youth Best and surpassed Kirani James for the fifth-fastest by a Youth (under 18) athlete ever.

On April 30, 2018, Cooper was arrested for attempted grand theft auto. He was charged with multiple felonies, all of which were eventually dropped.

In April 2018, Cooper was offered a football scholarship by the Florida State Seminoles.

In February 2021 Cooper was arrested and charged with armed robbery following the theft of $19,000 worth of cell phones and merchandise from a Mobile One store in Miami. According to reports, Cooper brandished a firearm during the robbery before breaking open a glass case full of merchandise. Cooper cut his hand doing so, and later sought medical treatment for the wound; this helped lead to his arrest.

On Jan 6 2022 Cooper was sentenced to 84 months in prison for his role in the robbery.

== Personal bests ==
Outdoor events
Event	Time (sec)	Venue	Date
100 metres	10.32	Gainesville (James G. Pressly Stadium), Florida	30 March 2019
200 metres	20.55	Jacksonville (Kitchings Stadium), Florida	18 March 2017
400 metres	45.23	Humble (Turner Stadium), Texas	6 August 2016
Indoor events
Event	Time (sec)	Venue	Date
60 metres	6.72	Lynchburg (Liberty-Indoor Track Complex), Virginia	6 March 2020
200 metres	21.00	Lynchburg (Liberty-Indoor Track Complex), Virginia	6 March 2020
300 metres	32.87	New York City (Armory), New York	4 February 2017
400 metres	46.01	Fayetteville (Randal Tyson TC), Arkansas	11 February 2017
