= Tryphena Hewett =

Australian athlete (born 2005)

Personal information
- Nationality: Australian
- Born: 22 October 2005 (age 20)

Sport
- Sport: Athletics
- Event: Pole vault
Medal record
Women's athletics
Representing Australia
World U20 Championships
Bronze medal – third place	2024 Lima	Pole vault

Tryphena Hewett (born 22 October 2005) is an Australian pole vaulter. She was a bronze medalist at the 2024 World Athletics U20 Championships.

== Early life ==
She attended Heights School in Adelaide before attending University of South Australia.

== Career ==
In January 2024, she made two qualifying jumps for the U20 World Championships in the pole vault. That month, she also cleared 1.80 metres in the high jump. She won the pole vault at the Adelaide Invitational in 2024 despite competing as a junior with a height of 4.20 metres. She won the Australian U20 Championships in the pole vault in April 2024.

In August 2024, she won a bronze medal in the pole vault at the 2024 World Athletics U20 Championships in Lima, Peru, with a jump of 4.15 metres.

She increased her personal best to 4.25 metres at the Perth Classic on 1 March 2025. She was selected for the 2025 Summer World University Games in Germany, placing eighth in the final. Hewett won the Australian Short Track Championships in February 2026.
