= Clara Fernández =

Spanish pole vaulter (born 2003)

Personal information
- Full name: Clara Fernández Ortiz
- Nationality: Spanish
- Born: 22 October 2003 (age 23)

Sport
- Sport: Athletics
- Event: Pole Vault

Achievements and titles
- Personal best: Pole vault 4.25m (2025)
Medal record
Women's athletics
Representing Spain
European Youth Olympic Festival
Silver medal – second place	2019 Baku	Pole vault

Clara Fernández Ortiz (born 22 October 2003) is a Spanish pole vaulter. A successful junior athlete, she was runner-up at the 2025 Spanish Indoor Athletics Championships.

== Early life ==
She is from Sant Cugat del Vallès, to the north of Barcelona, Catalonia. As a youngster she participated in pole vault.

== Career ==
She is a member of Club Muntanyenc Sant Cugat. She won the Spanish U16 Indoor Championships in the pole vault, clearing 3.66m in 2018. Later that year, she increased her personal best to 3.81 metres, and then 3.85 metres, a Spanish U16 best.

She won a silver medal at the 2019 European Youth Olympic Festival in Baku, at the age of 15 years-old. She became Spanish U18 champion in 2019 with a Catalan U18 best of 3.91 metres. That year, she cleared 4 metres for the first time. She retained her Spanish U18 title in 2020, and later made her debut at the senior national championships, finishing 9th in Madrid in September 2020.

She became Spanish U20 champion in 2021 and later increased her personal best to 4.05 metres. She competed in Tallinn at the 2021 European Athletics U20 Championships, but did not reach the final. In 2022, she retained her Spanish U20 title. She competed at the World Athletics U20 Championships in Cali, Colombia, without reaching the final.

She was a silver medalist at the Spanish U23 indoor championship in Málaga, in February 2023. The following year, she won the Spanish U23 indoor championship.

In February 2025, she finished second at the Spanish Indoor Athletics Championships, behind Maialen Axpe, but with a new personal best height of 4.25 metres. In July 2025, she won the pole vault at the outdoor Spanish U23 Championships in Badajoz.

== Personal life ==
Fernández has a large social media following, largely due to her attractive physical appearance, and has been called an influencer. Fernández is also a Nike athlete.
