= Colin Sahlman =

American long-distance runner (born 2003)

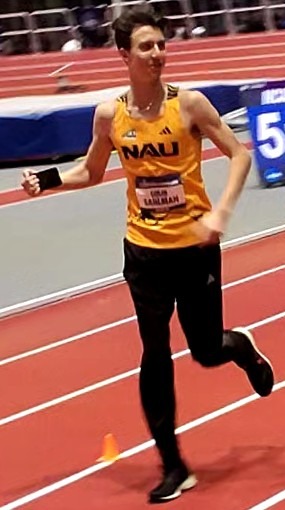
- Sahlman at the 2024 NCAA Division I Indoor Track and Field Championships

Personal information
- Nickname: SALAMI
- Nationality: American
- Born: October 28, 2003 (age 22)
- Education: Newbury Park High School
- Height: 6'0

Sport
- Country: United States
- Sport: Track and field
- Event: 800m–5000m
- University team: Northern Arizona Lumberjacks
- Coached by: Jared Cornfield

Achievements and titles
- Personal bests: *All information from athlete's World Athletics profile unless otherwise noted.: 800 m: 1:44.22 (Eugene 2026); 1500 m: 3:33.96 (Azusa 2024); Mile: 3:52.30i (Boston 2026); 3000 m: 7:36.71i (Boston 2025); 5000 m: 13:23.12 (Palo Alto 2026)

Colin Sahlman (born October 28, 2003) is an American middle- and long-distance runner. He is the reigning 2026 NCAA Indoor champion in both the 3,000 meters and the Distance Medley Relay.

== Career ==
Sahlman competes for Northern Arizona University. He ran for Newbury Park High School previously, where he won the 2021 RunningLane Cross Country Championships and ran personal bests of 8:33.32 in the 3200 meters and 3:56.24 in the mile shortly after graduating, at the 2022 Prefontaine Classic. He was also named the 2022 Gatorade Player of the Year both overall and in cross country.

At the 2024 John Thomas Terrier Classic in Boston, he set a personal best of 3:53.17 in the mile, setting a school record for NAU in the process.

Shortly after, Northern Arizona competed at the 2024 Husky classic, where Sahlman raced the 800 meters and ran both a personal best and school record of 1:47.88. He lowered his record to 1:47.48 at the 2024 Big Sky Indoor Conference Championships.

In September 2024, Sahlman signed an NIL deal with Hoka.

On August 1, 2025, at the 2025 USA Outdoor Track and Field Championships, after making it through the preliminary round the previous day, Sahlman ran a personal best of 1:44.80 in the semifinal to qualify for the final.

On March 13–14, 2026, Sahlman competed in the 2026 NCAA Indoor Track and Field Championships in Fayetteville, Arkansas. After qualifying for multiple events including the mile and the 800 meters, he elected to compete in the 3,000 meters and the Distance Medley relay.

After anchoring the winning NAU DMR team, Sahlman finished second in the 3,000 meters behind Habtom Samuel. However, Sahlman would be crowned the champion after Samuel was DQ'd for impeding Marco Langon on the final lap.
