= Rugilė Miklyčiūtė =

Lithuanian athlete

Personal information
- Nationality: Lithuania
- Born: 4 May 2005 (age 21) Kaunas, Lithuania

Sport
- Sport: Athletics
- Event: Pole Vault

Achievements and titles
- Personal bests: Pole vault: 4.57m (2026) NR
Medal record
Women's athletics
Representing Lithuania
European U23 Championships
Silver medal – second place	2025 Bergen	Pole vault
European U20 Championships
Silver medal – second place	2023 Jerusalem	Pole vault

Rugilė Miklyčiūtė (born 4 May 2005) is a Lithuanian pole vaulter. She is the national record holder at the event.

== Biography ==
She was educated at Kaunas Sports School "Startas" in Kaunas. sports school "Startas" R. Miklyčiūtė and trains in pole vault under coach Rita Sadzevičienė. At the 2020 Lithuanian Athletics Championships, she became the Lithuanian national champion for the first time at the age of 15 years-old.

In 2022, Miklyčiūtė became the first Lithuanian woman to clear 4 m. She set a new Lithuanian national record (4.10 m) at the 2022 Lithuanian Athletics Championships. She competed in the qualifying round of the 2022 European Athletics U18 Championships in Jerusalem, Israel with a jump of 3.70 m but did not progress to the final, placing fourteenth overall.

In 2023, at the age of 18 years-old, she competed the European U20 Championships in Jerusalem, Israel, and improved the Lithuanian record (4.15 m) to win the silver medal.

In 2024, she improved the national record twice in nine days, jumping 4.20 metres and the Baltic Youth Championships held in Valmiera and later improved it to 4.26 metres. She competed at the 2024 World Athletics U20 Championships in Lima, Peru.

On 25 June 2025, in Madrid, at the 2025 European Athletics Team Championships First Division competition, she improved her own Lithuanian pole vault record with 4.30 m. She improved it again the following month at the 2025 European Athletics U23 Championships in Bergen, Norway to 4.35 metres, winning the silver medal.

In January 2026, she improved her national record as she cleared 4.40m at the Riga Indoor Cup. Having cleared a new national record of 4.57 metres in Finland in June 2026, in August, she was a finalist competing at the 2026 European Athletics Championships in Birmingham, England.
