= Elise de Jong =

Dutch athlete (born 2006)

Personal information
- Born: 8 April 2006 (age 20)

Sport
- Sport: Athletics
- Event: Pole vault

Achievements and titles
- Personal best: Pole vault: 4.50 m (2025)
Medal record
Women's athletics
Representing Netherlands
European U20 Championships
Gold medal – first place	2025 Tampere	Pole vault

Elise de Jong (born 8 April 2006) is a Dutch pole vaulter. She became the European under-20 champion in 2025.

== Career ==
She is from Rotterdam and started in athletics at the age of nine years-old having come from a gymnastics background. She is a member of PAC Rotterdam as well as training at AAV'36 in Alphen aan den Rijn. She competed in multi-events as well as pole vault before focusing on pole vault more fully.

She won the Dutch U20 Championships in Utrecht in June 2024. She was selected to represent the Netherlands at the 2024 World Athletics U20 Championships in Lima, Peru, placing ninth overall in her international championships debut.

She set the Dutch under-20 record at 4.32 metres competing in January 2025 in Zoetermeer. She was runner-up to training partner Marijn Kieft at the Dutch Indoor Athletics Championships in Appeldoorn in February 2025, having made a successful clearance of 4.25 metres she skipped 4.30 and attempted to win the title with 4.35 metres but did not clear the bar. Later in 2025, she improved the Dutch under-20 record to 4.50 metres.

She was runner-up to Kieft at the Dutch Athletics Championships in Hengelo in August 2025, with a height of 4.41 metres with Kieft taking her under-20 national record with 4.51 metres. Later that month, she won her first international championship title in the pole vault at the 2025 European Athletics U20 Championships in Tampere, Finland, finishing in first place overall with a successful clearance of 4.50 metres to equal her personal best with Marijn Kieft finishing second.

Having cleared 4.30 metres, she was runner-up to Marijn Kieft at the Dutch Indoor Athletics Championships in Appeldoorn in February 2026.

== Personal life ==
She joined the Econometrics program at Erasmus University Rotterdam.
