= Elien Vekemans =

Belgian pole vaulter (born 2001)

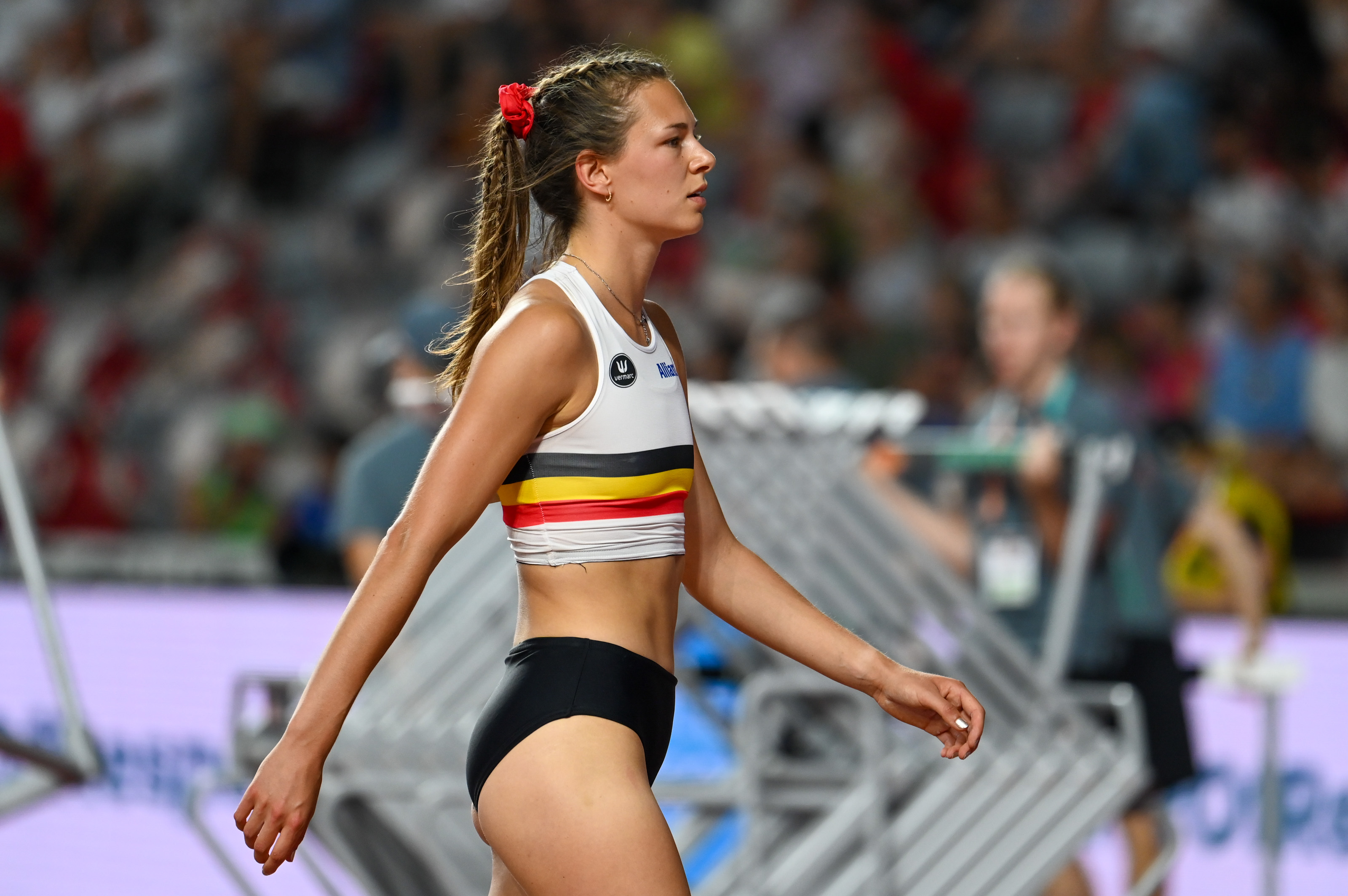
- Elien Vekemans at the 2023 World Championships.

Personal information
- Born: 30 April 2001 (age 25)

Sport
- Sport: Athletics
- Event: Pole vault

Achievements and titles
- Personal best: Pole vault: 4.73m (2025)
Medal record
Women's athletics
Representing Belgium
European U23 Championships
Silver medal – second place	2023 Espoo	Pole Vault
European U20 Championships
Bronze medal – third place	2019 Borås	Pole Vault
Summer World University Games
Gold medal – first place	2025 Bochum	Pole vault

Elien Vekemans (born 30 April 2001) is a Belgian pole vaulter. In 2024, she became the national record holder in the event.

== Biography ==
Vekemans’ first sport was gymnastics. Coordination and body awareness are very important in gymnastics, and that also applies to pole vaulting.

In 2018, she set a junior Belgian record of 4.25 metres competing in Oordegem. She won the bronze medal at the 2019 European Athletics U20 Championships in Borås. Later that month she set a new junior Belgian record of 4.26 metres whilst competing in Amiens.

In June 2023, she finished fourth competing for Belgium at the 2023 European Athletics Team Championships First Division in Silesia with a height of 4.50 metres. She won the silver medal at the 2023 European Athletics U23 Championships in Espoo, Finland behind Frenchwoman Marie-Julie Bonnin. She competed at the 2023 World Athletics Championships in Budapest, placing 29th in qualifying with a 4.35 metres clearance but not reaching the final.

In July 2024, Vekemans broke the Belgian outdoor record with a 4.52 metres clearance at the Flanders Cup in Leuven, but was still 1 cm short of the overall Belgian record of Fanny Smets 4.53 metres clearance from 2021. In Krk, Croatia on 30 August 2024 she set a new national record height of 4.54 metres.

In Rouen on 25 January 2025, she increased her national record with a 4.56 metres clearance. She competed at the 2025 European Athletics Indoor Championships in Apeldoorn, Netherlands, and progressed to the final finishing in the top-eight. In 2025's outdoor season, she bettered the national record four times, clearing 4.61 metres at the Paavo Nurmi Games leg of the 2025 World Athletics Continental Tour in Turku, Finland, 4.65 metres at the 2025 2nd Division European Athletics Team Championships in Maribor, Slovenia., 4.66 metres at the KBC Night of Athletics in Heusden-Zolder, Belgium and finally 4.73 metres at the Stabhochsprungmeeting in Jockgrim, Germany which bought her a ticket for the 2025 World Athletics Championships in Tokyo, Japan. She cleared 4.60 metres to win gold at the 2025 Summer World University Games in Germany.

She competed at the 2025 World Athletics Championships in Tokyo, Japan, in September 2025, without advancing to the final.

In August 2026, she competed at the 2026 European Athletics Championships in Birmingham, England, placing joint-fourth overall. At the 2026 Diamond League Final in Brussels in September, she placed seventh with 4.55 metres.

== Personal life ==
Her brother Daan Vekemans is a professional footballer. Their parents emigrated to Austria in 2021 to open a hotel. She studied in the United States at and competed for the University of Oklahoma and the University of Arkansas. She later returned to study bioengineering at KU Leuven the city of Leuven located in the province of Flemish Brabant, Flemish Region, Belgium after a period of ill health.
