= Gemma Tutton =

British athlete (born 2004)

Personal information
- Nationality: British
- Born: 8 November 2004 (age 21) Lewes, England

Sport
- Sport: Athletics
- Event: Pole Vault

Achievements and titles
- Personal bests: Pole vault: 4.52 m (Salem, 2026)

Gemma Tutton (born 8 November 2004) is a British pole vaulter. She won the 2026 UK Athletics Championships.

== Biography ==
From Lewes in East Sussex, Tutton is a member of Lewes Athletics Club and is coached by Richard Pilling. She also trains with the Lewes Pole Vault Group who practise in a barn at the Iford Estate Farm in Lewes, East Sussex. She has held national records at U13 and U15 level, and won the English schools intermediate field pole vault title in July 2021.

Tutton reached the final of the 2022 World Athletics U20 Championships in Cali, Colombia, placing tenth overall with a personal best clearance of 4.10 metres.

In May 2024, competing for Duke University, Tutton set a new personal best clearance of 4.37 metres at the AAC Championships. In November 2024, she was named by British Athletics on the Olympic Futures Programme for 2025.

Tutton cleared a personal best height of 4.42 metres in April 2025. She was selected for the Great Britain team to compete at the 2025 European Athletics Team Championships in Madrid in June 2025, where she cleared a personal best height of 4.45 metres to place fifth overall in the first division. She was named in the British team for the 2025 European Athletics U23 Championships in Bergen and was named in the British team for the 2025 Summer World University Games in Germany. In October 2025, she was retained on the British Athletics Olympic Futures Programme for 2025/26.

In February 2026, in Winston-Salem, Tutton jumped a personal beat 4.52 metres. She subsequently qualified for the 2026 NCAA Division I Indoor Track and Field Championships, placing twelfth overall. In June, she finished ninth at the 2026 NCAA Outdoor Championships, with a clearance of 4.49 metres. On 20 June, Tutton cleared 4.50 metres to win the 2026 UK Athletics Championships title in Birmingham. She was selected to represent England, placing fifth overall, in the pole vault at the 2026 Commonwealth Games in Glasgow, Scotland. In August, she competed at the 2026 European Athletics Championships in Birmingham, England. In October 2026, she was retained on the 2026/27 Olympic Futures Programme awarded by UK Athletics.

== Personal life ==
Alongside her sister Maya, she founded the Our Streets Now social campaign in 2019 aimed to educate about sexual harassment and to make street harassment a criminal offence in the United Kingdom.
