= Viktorie Ondrová =

Czech athlete (born 2005)

Personal information
- Born: 25 June 2005 (age 21) Poděbrady, Czech Republic

Sport
- Sport: Athletics
- Event: Pole Vault

Achievements and titles
- Personal bests: Pole vault: 4.45 m (Bergen, 2025)
Medal record
Women's athletics
Representing Czech Republic
European U23 Championships
Gold medal – first place	2025 Bergen	Pole vault
European U20 Championships
Silver medal – second place	2022 Jerusalem	Pole vault

Viktorie Ondrová (born 24 June 2005) is a Czech pole vaulter. She won the senior Czech Indoor Athletics Championships title in February 2025, and later won the gold medal at the 2025 European Athletics U23 Championships.

== Career ==
From Poděbrady, she competed in gymnastics at Sokol Poděbrady before focusing on athletics at PSK Olymp Prague club. After two years of training she set a Czech age-group national record with a clearance of 3.75 metres to win the national age-group title with a new championship record, in 2020.

She won the silver medal at the 2022 European Athletics U18 Championships in Jerusalem, Israel. She finished third overall at the senior Czech Athletics Championships in June 2024 with a jump of 4.31 metres. She was selected to represent her country at the 2024 World Athletics U20 Championships in Lima, Peru.

She won the Czech Indoor Athletics Championships in Ostrava in February 2025 with a jump of 4.26 metres. She won the gold medal at the 2025 European Athletics U23 Championships in Bergen, Norway, breaking her lifetime best three times to win with 4.45 metres. The performance moved her to seventh place on the Czech all-time list.
