= Hope Tour =

2023–24 concert tour by NF

- Tour by NF
- Associated album: Hope
- Start date: July 12, 2023
- End date: October 15, 2024
- Legs: 3
- No. of shows: 74

NF concert chronology
- The Search Tour; Hope Tour

The Hope Tour was the headlining concert tour by American rapper NF in support of his fifth studio album, Hope (2023) which debuted at number 2 on the Billboard 200 chart. The tour was produced by Live Nation and included shows across North America, Europe, the United Kingdom, Australia, and New Zealand. The initial itinerary was announced in March 2023 as a 47-date run, but extended the tour when over 250,000 tickets were sold for the first leg.

In year-end reporting based on figures submitted to Billboard Boxscore, the tour was listed as number 6 on Billboard's top 10 grossing rap tours of 2023.

== Background ==
On March 30, 2023, NF announced the tour as a 47-show route across the United States, Canada, Europe and the United Kingdom. The North American leg was billed with Cordae as special guest.

On September 21, 2023, NF announced a second leg of the tour, adding dates in Australia and New Zealand followed by a further U.S. arena run in 2024.

== Set list ==
This set list is representative of the performance on October 15, 2023, at Eventim Apollo in London, England. It does not represent all shows throughout the tour.

1. "Hope"
2. "Motto"
3. "Careful"
4. "The Search"
5. "Leave Me Alone"
6. "My Stress"
7. "Time"
8. "Paid My Dues"
9. "Why"
10. -Interlude-
11. "Hate Myself"
12. "Mama"
13. "Happy"
14. "Pandemonium"
15. "Let You Down"
16. "Gone"
17. "Running"
18. "When I Grow Up"
19. "Returns"
20. "Clouds"

=== Notes ===
- Interlude was played over the venue speakers and was not performed live by NF.
- During "Running", the performance was restarted due to a medical emergency in the crowd.

== Shows ==
List of concerts, showing date, city, country, venue, opening act, attendance and amount of gross revenue
| Date | City | Country | Venue | Opening act | Attendance | Revenue |
North America (2023)
| July 12, 2023 | Columbus | United States | Schottenstein Center | Cordae | —N/a | —N/a |
| July 14, 2023 | Rosemont | United States | Allstate Arena | Cordae | —N/a | —N/a |
| July 15, 2023 | Minneapolis | United States | Target Center | Cordae | —N/a | —N/a |
| July 16, 2023 | Lincoln | United States | Pinnacle Bank Arena | Cordae | —N/a | —N/a |
| July 18, 2023 | Grand Rapids | United States | Van Andel Arena | Cordae | —N/a | —N/a |
| July 20, 2023 | Newark | United States | Prudential Center | Cordae | —N/a | —N/a |
| July 21, 2023 | Boston | United States | Agganis Arena | Cordae | —N/a | —N/a |
| July 22, 2023 | Philadelphia | United States | Liacouras Center | Cordae | —N/a | —N/a |
| July 24, 2023 | Greensboro | United States | Greensboro Coliseum Complex | Cordae | —N/a | —N/a |
| July 25, 2023 | Huntsville | United States | Propst Arena at the Von Braun Center | Cordae | —N/a | —N/a |
| July 26, 2023 | Nashville | United States | Bridgestone Arena | Cordae | —N/a | —N/a |
| July 28, 2023 | Orlando | United States | Addition Financial Arena | Cordae | —N/a | —N/a |
| July 29, 2023 | Duluth | United States | Gas South Arena | Cordae | —N/a | —N/a |
| July 31, 2023 | North Little Rock | United States | Simmons Bank Arena | Cordae | —N/a | —N/a |
| August 1, 2023 | Tulsa | United States | BOK Center | Cordae | —N/a | —N/a |
| August 2, 2023 | Fort Worth | United States | Dickies Arena | Cordae | —N/a | —N/a |
| August 4, 2023 | Glendale | United States | Desert Diamond Arena | Cordae | —N/a | —N/a |
| August 5, 2023 | Anaheim | United States | Honda Center | Cordae | —N/a | —N/a |
| August 6, 2023 | San Francisco | United States | Bill Graham Civic Auditorium | Cordae | —N/a | —N/a |
| August 8, 2023 | Portland | United States | Veterans Memorial Coliseum | Cordae | —N/a | —N/a |
| August 9, 2023 | Seattle | United States | WAMU Theater | Cordae | —N/a | —N/a |
| August 11, 2023 | Salt Lake City | United States | Vivint Arena | Cordae | —N/a | —N/a |
| August 12, 2023 | Denver | United States | Ball Arena | Cordae | —N/a | —N/a |
| August 23, 2023 | Vancouver | Canada | Rogers Arena | Cordae | —N/a | —N/a |
| August 25, 2023 | Calgary | Canada | Scotiabank Saddledome | Cordae | —N/a | —N/a |
| August 26, 2023 | Edmonton | Canada | Rogers Place | Cordae | —N/a | —N/a |
| August 27, 2023 | Saskatoon | Canada | SaskTel Centre | Cordae | —N/a | —N/a |
| August 29, 2023 | Winnipeg | Canada | Canada Life Centre | Cordae | —N/a | —N/a |
| September 1, 2023 | Toronto | Canada | Scotiabank Arena | Cordae | —N/a | —N/a |
| September 2, 2023 | Ottawa | Canada | Canadian Tire Centre | Cordae | —N/a | —N/a |
| September 3, 2023 | Laval | Canada | Place Bell | Cordae | —N/a | —N/a |
Europe and United Kingdom (2023)
| September 23, 2023 | Milan | Italy | Fabrique | | —N/a | —N/a |
| September 24, 2023 | Zürich | Switzerland | Halle 622 | | —N/a | —N/a |
| September 26, 2023 | Vienna | Austria | Gasometer | | —N/a | —N/a |
| September 27, 2023 | Munich | Germany | Zenith | | —N/a | —N/a |
| September 29, 2023 | Düsseldorf | Germany | Mitsubishi Electric Halle | | —N/a | —N/a |
| September 30, 2023 | Amsterdam | Netherlands | AFAS Live | | —N/a | —N/a |
| October 1, 2023 | Paris | France | L’Olympia | | —N/a | —N/a |
| October 3, 2023 | Frankfurt | Germany | Jahrhunderthalle | | —N/a | —N/a |
| October 5, 2023 | Hamburg | Germany | Sporthalle | | —N/a | —N/a |
| October 6, 2023 | Berlin | Germany | Max-Schmeling-Halle | | —N/a | —N/a |
| October 8, 2023 | Brussels | Belgium | Forest National | | —N/a | —N/a |
| October 10, 2023 | Manchester | United Kingdom | O2 Victoria Warehouse | | —N/a | —N/a |
| October 11, 2023 | Glasgow | United Kingdom | O2 Academy | | —N/a | —N/a |
| October 12, 2023 | Dublin | Ireland | 3Olympia Theatre | | —N/a | —N/a |
| October 14, 2023 | Cardiff | United Kingdom | Great Hall | | —N/a | —N/a |
| October 15, 2023 | London | United Kingdom | Eventim Apollo | | —N/a | —N/a |
Oceania (2024)
| February 2, 2024 | Perth | Australia | HBF Stadium | | —N/a | —N/a |
| February 4, 2024 | Melbourne | Australia | John Cain Arena | | —N/a | —N/a |
| February 7, 2024 | Brisbane | Australia | Brisbane Entertainment Centre | | —N/a | —N/a |
| February 9, 2024 | Sydney | Australia | Qudos Bank Arena | | —N/a | —N/a |
| February 11, 2024 | Auckland | New Zealand | Spark Arena | | —N/a | —N/a |
North America (2024)
| May 8, 2024 | Milwaukee | United States | Fiserv Forum | | —N/a | —N/a |
| May 10, 2024 | Kansas City | United States | T-Mobile Center | | —N/a | —N/a |
| May 11, 2024 | Indianapolis | United States | Gainbridge Fieldhouse | | —N/a | —N/a |
| May 12, 2024 | St. Louis | United States | Chaifetz Arena | | —N/a | —N/a |
| May 14, 2024 | Detroit | United States | Little Caesars Arena | | —N/a | —N/a |
| May 15, 2024 | Pittsburgh | United States | PPG Paints Arena | | —N/a | —N/a |
| May 16, 2024 | Uncasville | United States | Mohegan Sun Arena | | —N/a | —N/a |
| May 18, 2024 | Charlotte | United States | Spectrum Center | | —N/a | —N/a |
| May 19, 2024 | Baltimore | United States | CFG Bank Arena | | —N/a | —N/a |
| May 21, 2024 | Hershey | United States | Giant Center | | —N/a | —N/a |
| May 22, 2024 | Raleigh | United States | PNC Arena | | —N/a | —N/a |
| May 24, 2024 | Tampa | United States | Amalie Arena | | —N/a | —N/a |
| May 25, 2024 | Sunrise | United States | Amerant Bank Arena | | —N/a | —N/a |
| May 26, 2024 | Jacksonville | United States | VyStar Veterans Memorial Arena | | —N/a | —N/a |
| May 28, 2024 | Greenville | United States | Bon Secours Wellness Arena | | —N/a | —N/a |
| May 29, 2024 | Birmingham | United States | Legacy Arena at the BJCC | | —N/a | —N/a |
| May 31, 2024 | Oklahoma City | United States | Paycom Center | | —N/a | —N/a |
| June 1, 2024 | Dallas | United States | American Airlines Center | | —N/a | —N/a |
| June 2, 2024 | Austin | United States | Moody Center | | —N/a | —N/a |
| June 6, 2024 | San Diego | United States | Viejas Arena at San Diego State University | | —N/a | —N/a |
| June 7, 2024 | Inglewood | United States | Kia Forum | | —N/a | —N/a |
| June 8, 2024 | Sacramento | United States | Golden 1 Center | | —N/a | —N/a |
