= Ilia Malinin =

American figure skater (born 2004)

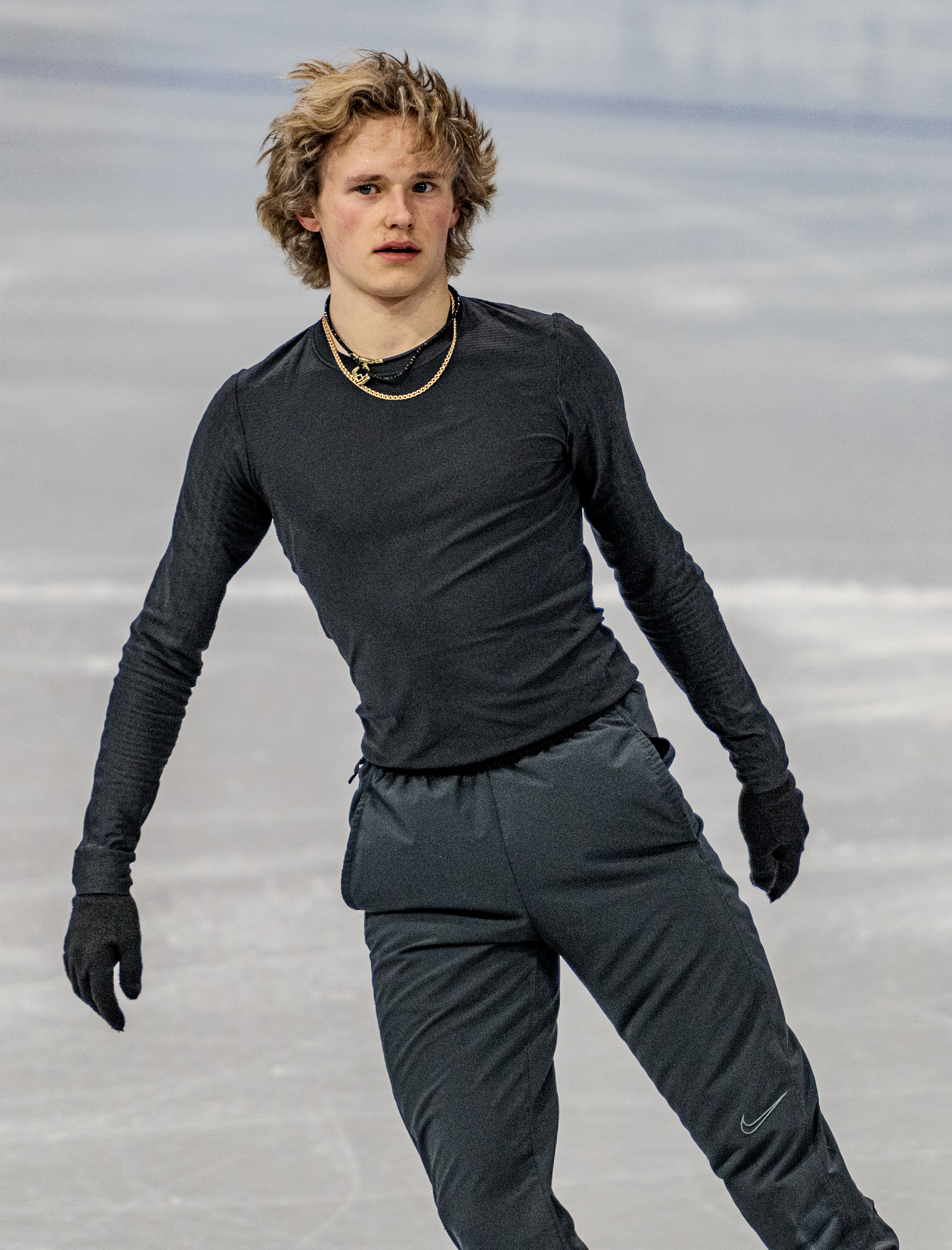
- Malinin during a practice session at the 2026 Winter Olympics

Personal information
- Nickname: Quad God
- Born: Ilia Roman Malinin; December 2, 2004 (age 21) Fairfax County, Virginia, U.S.
- Height: 5 ft 8 1/2 in (174 cm)

Figure skating career
- Country: United States
- Discipline: Men's singles
- Coach: Tatiana Malinina; Roman Skorniakov; Rafael Arutyunyan
- Skating club: Washington Figure Skating Club
- Began skating: 2011
- Highest WS: 1st

Medal record
Event	Gold medal – first place	Silver medal – second place	Bronze medal – third place
Olympic Games	1	0	0
World Championships	3	0	1
Grand Prix Final	3	0	1
U.S. Championships	4	1	0
World Team Trophy	2	0	0
World Junior Championships	1	0	0
Medal list
Olympic Games
Gold medal – first place	2026 Milano Cortina	Team
World Championships
Gold medal – first place	2024 Montreal	Singles
Gold medal – first place	2025 Boston	Singles
Gold medal – first place	2026 Prague	Singles
Bronze medal – third place	2023 Saitama	Singles
Grand Prix Final
Gold medal – first place	2023–24 Beijing	Singles
Gold medal – first place	2024–25 Grenoble	Singles
Gold medal – first place	2025–26 Nagoya	Singles
Bronze medal – third place	2022–23 Turin	Singles
U.S. Championships
Gold medal – first place	2023 San Jose	Singles
Gold medal – first place	2024 Columbus	Singles
Gold medal – first place	2025 Wichita	Singles
Gold medal – first place	2026 St. Louis	Singles
Silver medal – second place	2022 Nashville	Singles
World Team Trophy
Gold medal – first place	2023 Tokyo	Team
Gold medal – first place	2025 Tokyo	Team
World Junior Championships
Gold medal – first place	2022 Tallinn	Singles

Ilia Roman Malinin (born December 2, 2004) is an American figure skater. He is a 2026 Olympic Games team event gold medalist, three-time World champion (2024, 2025, 2026), three-time Grand Prix Final champion (2023, 2024, 2025), eight-time Grand Prix gold medalist, four-time Challenger Series gold medalist, and four-time U.S. national champion (2023–26). At the junior level, Malinin is the 2022 World Junior champion and a two-time Junior Grand Prix gold medalist. He holds the current world junior record for the men's free skate and combined score, as well as the senior record for the men's free skate.

Malinin is the only skater to successfully land a fully rotated quadruple Axel in international competition, accomplishing this feat at the 2022 CS U.S. International Classic and performing it multiple times since. In September 2022, he was named to Time magazine's Time 100 Next List. He is nicknamed "Quad God", a reference to his signature quadruple jumps.

== Personal life and education ==
He is the son of Tatiana Malinina, an Olympic skater who competed for Uzbekistan and was the 1999 Grand Prix of Figure Skating Final champion, 1999 Four Continents champion, and ten-time Uzbek national champion; and Roman Skorniakov, also an Olympic skater who competed for Russia before switching to Uzbekistan and was a seven-time Uzbek national champion. His younger sister Elli Beatrice Malinina also competes in figure skating. He was given his mother's surname (in the masculine inflection) because his parents were concerned that his father's surname would be too difficult to pronounce. He is fluent in Russian. His maternal grandfather, Valery Malinin, is a former competitor for the Soviet Union and works as a skating coach in Novosibirsk, Russia.

Malinin attended George C. Marshall High School, where he graduated in 2023. His favorite subject while in high school was Physics. He currently attends George Mason University.

== Career ==
=== Early career ===
Malinin began skating at the age of six in 2011 under the tutelage of his parents in Reston, Virginia. When he was a child, he often preferred playing soccer to training in a cold arena, but his grandfather advised his parents to be patient, saying "he'll [gain] his triple jumps, [and then] you won't be able to drag him away.” He went on to become the 2016 U.S. national juvenile champion, the 2017 U.S. national intermediate champion, and the 2019 U.S. national novice bronze medalist. Internationally, Malinin is the 2018 Asian Open Trophy champion at the advanced novice level and the 2018 Golden Bear of Zagreb silver medalist.

=== Junior career ===
==== 2019–20 season: Junior international debut ====
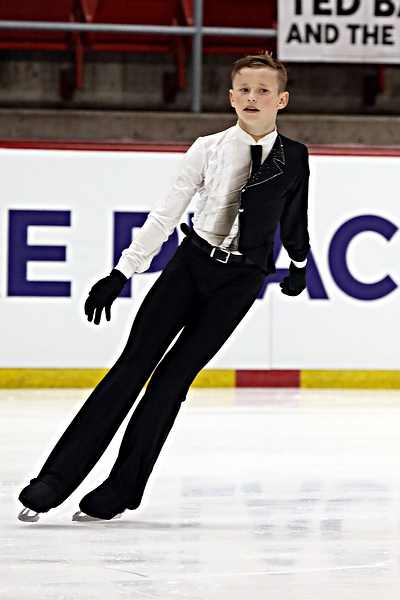
Malinin at 2019 JGP in the United States

Malinin made his junior international debut at the Philadelphia Summer International, where he won the gold medal. On the 2019 ISU Junior Grand Prix (JGP) circuit, he placed fourth at the JGP in the United States and seventh at the JGP in Italy. He was unable to compete at the 2020 U.S. Championships due to injury, but was awarded a berth to the 2020 World Junior Championships based on his early season results. At the World Junior Championships, he placed thirteenth in the short program and eighteenth in the free skate, finishing sixteenth overall.

==== 2020–21 season ====
Due to the COVID-19 pandemic, the 2020 ISU Junior Grand Prix circuit, where Malinin would have competed, was cancelled. He was instead invited to compete at the 2020 Skate America, where he finished fifth after unveiling two new quadruple jumps – the toe loop and Salchow – that he had learned during lock-down. As a result of his placement, he was invited to participate in the Las Vegas Invitational, where he helped Team Tara defeat Team Johnny. He gained the nickname "Quad God" after adopting the Instagram handle "quadg0d" in late 2020, as inspiration for the quadruple jumps that he was striving to learn. Malinin was unable to compete at the 2021 U.S. Championships after missing the qualifying competition due to an ankle injury.

==== 2021–22 season: World Junior champion and two Junior Grand Prix gold ====
With the resumption of the Junior Grand Prix circuit, Malinin returned to international competition at the first edition of the 2021 JGP in France in Courchevel, winning the gold medal despite errors on both of his attempted quadruple jumps in his free skate. He called it "a struggle since I haven't competed in a year, but I think now that I'm back, things are starting going back to normal." At his second event, the 2021 JGP in Austria in Linz, Malinin entered as one of the favorites for the gold medal and won with new personal bests in all segments. He landed a quadruple Salchow successfully in the free skate, although he made an error attempting a quadruple toe loop. With two gold medals, he qualified for the 2021 Junior Grand Prix Final. However, the event was later cancelled due to travel restrictions to Japan prompted by the SARS-CoV-2 Omicron variant.

Malinin finished the season at the 2022 World Junior Championships, which was delayed from early March to mid-April and relocated from Bulgaria to Estonia. He entered the event as the favorite for the gold medal based on his strong season. In the short program, he set a new junior world record of 88.99. He won the free skate as well, setting junior world records for that segment and for total score, winning the gold medal by a margin of almost 42 points.

=== Senior career ===
==== 2021–22 season: Senior international debut ====
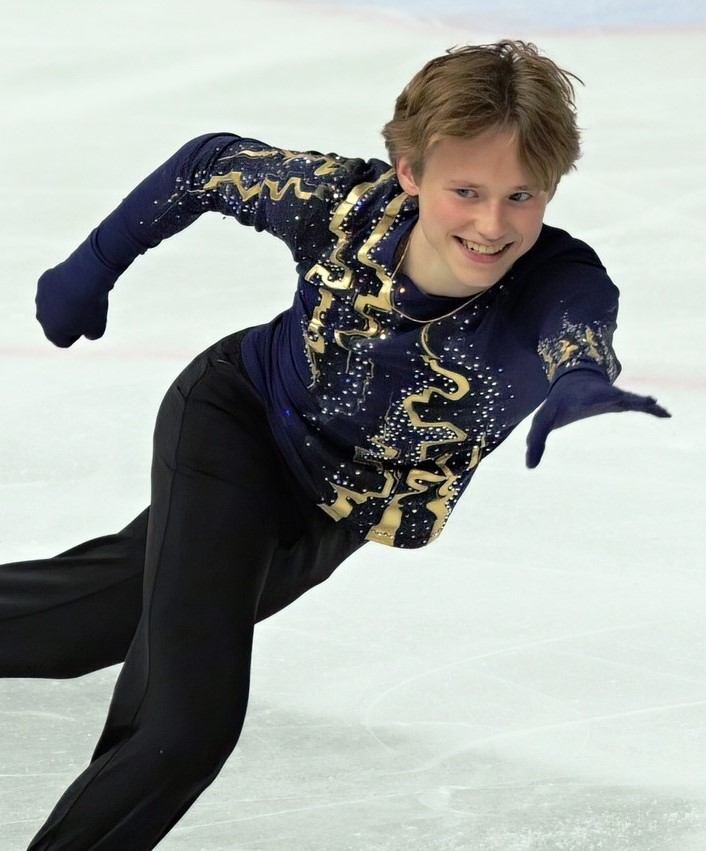
Malinin at the 2021 Cup of Austria

Early in his senior career, he became known for his technical prowess, particularly for landing multiple quadruple jumps, including quad-quad combinations. Returning to the senior level at the 2021 Cup of Austria in November, he placed thirteenth in the short program, but rallied back with a second-place free skate to win the bronze medal. Competing at the 2022 U.S. Championships with hopes of making the American team to the 2022 Winter Olympics, he placed third in the short program. He finished second in the free skate with four quadruple jumps, winning the silver medal, which he said: "I definitely wasn't expecting to skate this good and especially place second."

Malinin's placement meant that, per qualification criteria, the third berth on the Olympic team was to be decided between him and fourth-place Jason Brown. Ultimately, the committee chose Brown, a result that attracted some controversy. Malinin was instead assigned to make his World Championship debut later in the year. Brown praised him, saying: "U.S. figure skating is so lucky to have such a bright future with Ilia."

In advance of the 2022 World Championships, Malinin was sent to the International Challenge Cup to secure the required technical minimum scores. He was successful, winning the gold medal in the process. Competing at the World Championships in Montpellier, France, Malinin finished fourth in the short program with a personal best of 100.16, exceeding his previous best international score by almost 20 points. In the free skate, he made major errors on two quadruple jump attempts and dropped to ninth overall. He spoke afterwards of having put "more pressure on myself, just wanting to skate good so badly, and it kind of didn't work out."

==== 2022–23 season: World bronze and first Grand Prix Final medal ====
Malinin opened his season at the 2022 U.S. International Classic. He placed sixth in his short program. His free skate, which was set to the Euphoria soundtrack and choreographed by Shae-Lynn Bourne, consisted of five quadruple jumps, including a quadruple Axel, making him the first skater to ever successfully land the jump in international competition. American figure skater Adam Rippon called Malinin's accomplishment "the craziest thing I've ever seen anyone do on the ice.” His free skate also included a difficult triple Lutz-triple Axel jump combination. He fell while attempting a quadruple Lutz, but successfully completed all of his other jumps. He finished first in the free skate, earning a total of 257.28 points and finishing overall in first place.

At the Japan Open as part of Team North America, Malinin placed second in the men's free skate competition, earning a total of 193.42 points, just behind world champion Shoma Uno. He was unable to successfully land his quadruple Axel, although he had accomplished it during practice, but "effortlessly" completed all four of his other quadruple jumps. Returning to the senior Grand Prix at the 2022 Skate America, Malinin fell on his quadruple toe loop, but earned 86.08 points in his short program, which put him in fourth place. During his free skate, he fell on a quadruple Lutz-triple Salchow jump combination, but successfully landed four "solid" quadruple jumps, including a "beautiful" and "nearly perfectly" executed quadruple Axel. He also completed a quadruple toe loop, a quadruple Lutz, and a quadruple Salchow in the first half of the program. After an error on the Lutz combination in the second half, the Associated Press reported that "with an almost sheepish smile", he got back up from the ice and completed a triple flip-triple toe loop jump combination and a triple Lutz-triple Axel jump combination, which earned him a standing ovation from the audience. He earned 194.29 points in his free skate, with a total score of 280.37, putting him in first place overall. He was the youngest men's champion in the history of Skate America. At his second event, the 2022 Grand Prix of Espoo, Malinin placed second in the short program, revealing afterward that he was "a little bit injured". He won the free skate decisively, moving into first place and winning his second gold medal. These results qualified him to the 2022 Grand Prix Final in Turin, Italy. There, Malinin placed fifth in the short program with a score of 80.10. He indicated that he remained bothered by his injury and would not attempt a quadruple Lutz. He rebounded in the free skate, finishing in second place. He ultimately won the bronze medal. Malinin said his "goal [was] to definitely make sure that I'm able to be comfortable with my short program because, as of right now, it's been a bit messy."

Malinin entered the 2023 U.S. Championships as the gold medal favorite, and after a season of difficulties in the short program, delivered a clean performance to finish first in the segment. He acknowledged afterward that "this season, all the short programs have been really tough, and I think that we took every single one of them and thought about where we need to work and what to improve" to get to that performance. Malinin had planned to attempt six quadruple jumps in his free skate, but fell on one and doubled two others. He placed second in that segment, but won the gold medal on the strength of his short program score. At the 2023 World Championships, Malinin placed second in the short program, with a score of 100.38 points. He went on to attempt the most technically difficult free skate ever seen at the World Championships with six quadruple jumps, landing three cleanly – including the quadruple Axel, the first ever performed at an ISU championship event – earning 188.06 to place third in the free skate and third overall with a combined score of 288.44. During the 2023 championships, Japanese broadcaster Fuji TV presented him with a hat bearing the nickname "Quad God," which he later wore during media interviews and photo sessions.

==== 2023–24 season: World champion and Grand Prix Final gold ====
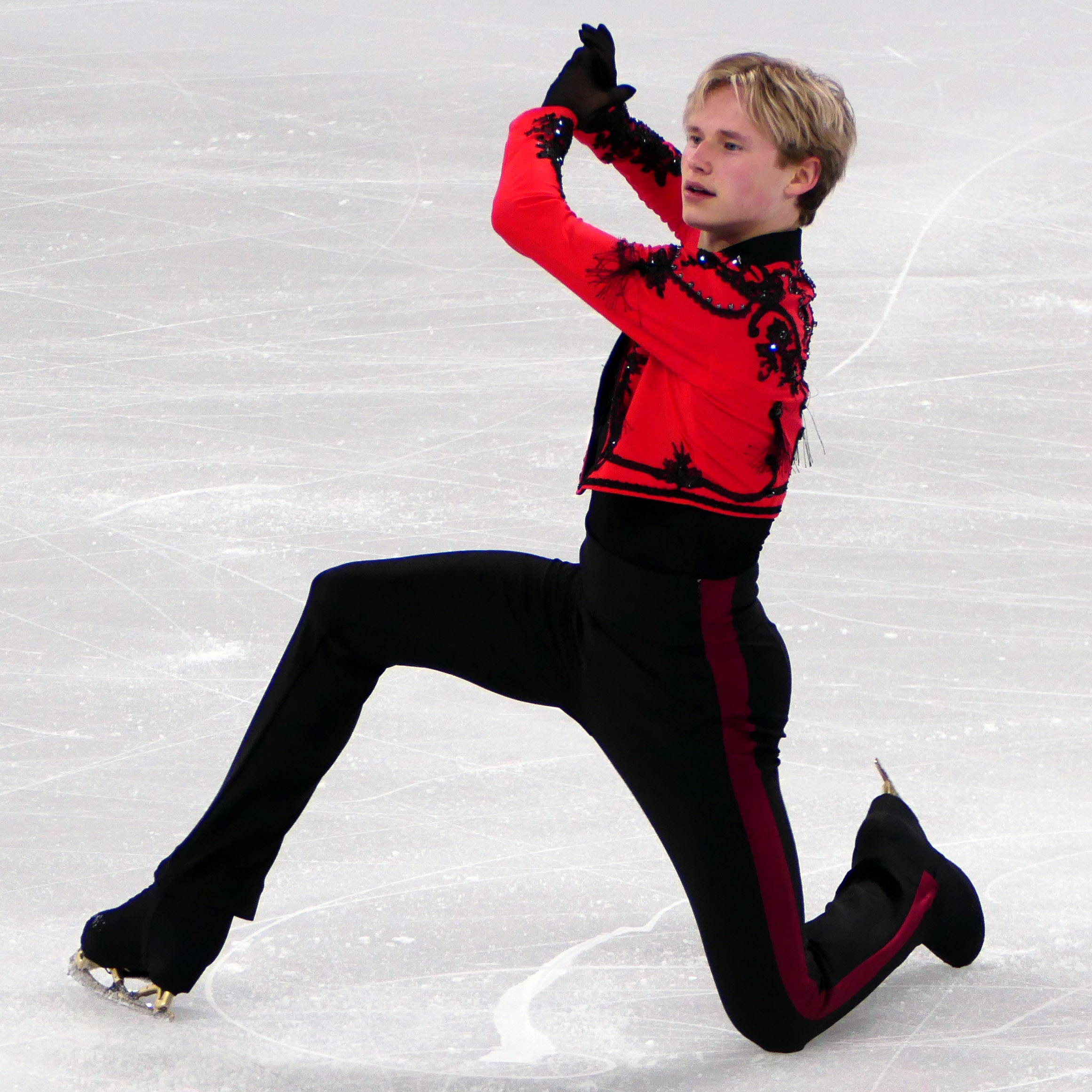
Malinin performing his short program at the 2024 World Championships

Malinin won the gold medal at the 2023 Autumn Classic International, his first international appearance of the season. He was invited to compete as part of Team North America at the Japan Open, and won the men's segment, while the team finished second overall.

Beginning the Grand Prix at the 2023 Skate America, Malinin won the short program by almost seven points. He called the performance "one of the best all my career so far. I was so into the music and the performance that I was not aware of what was going around me." He landed all of his jumps in the free skate as well, setting new personal bests in that segment (206.41) and overall (310.47), his first instances of breaking the 200- and 300-point barriers internationally. Malinin went on to win the silver medal at his second Grand Prix event at the 2023 Grand Prix de France and qualified for the Grand Prix Final in Beijing. There, Malinin became the first person to successfully perform a quadruple Axel during a short program. During the free skate, Malinin successfully performed a quadruple loop, thus becoming the first skater to ever perform all six jumps as quadruples in competition. He won the event by a margin of over 17 points.

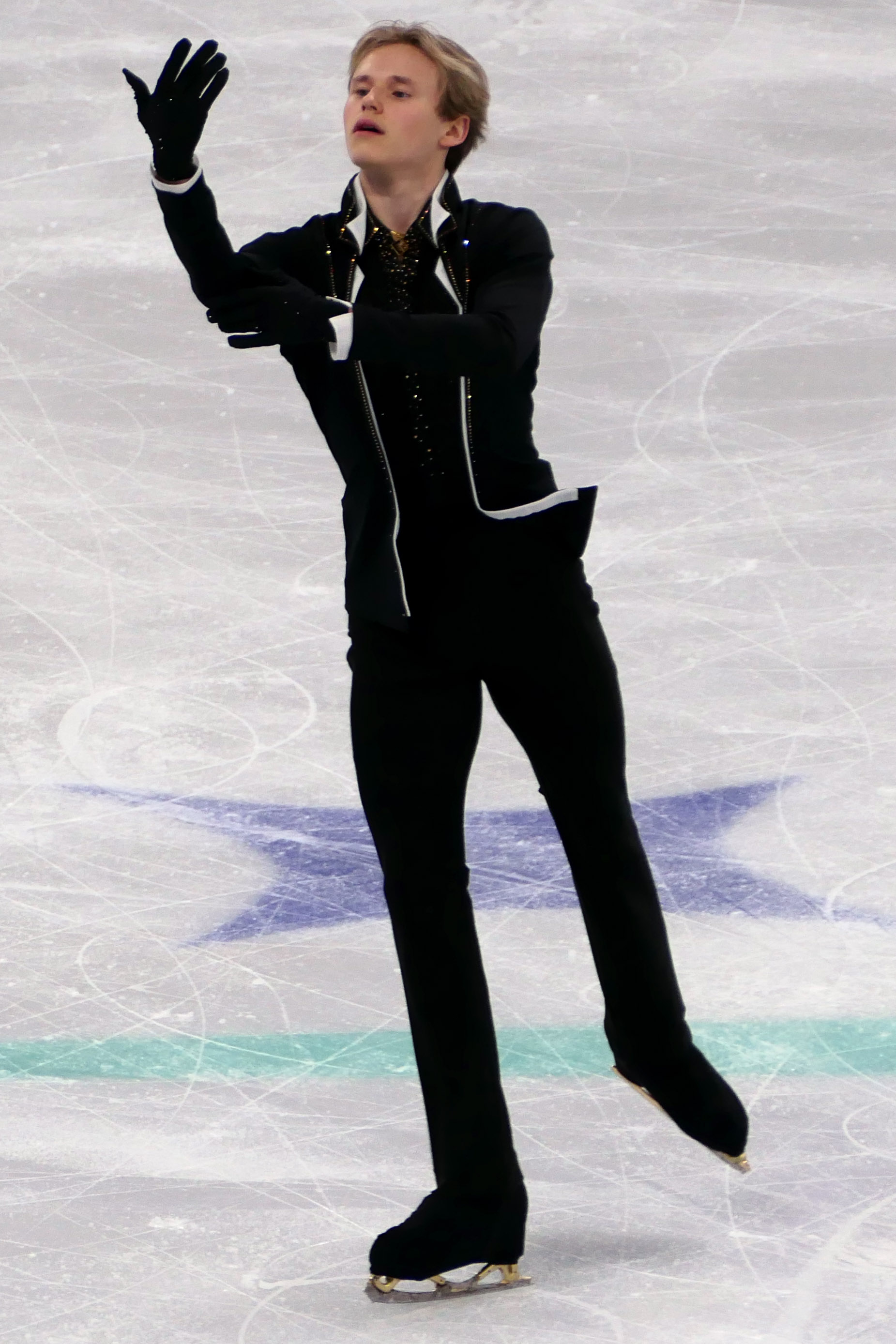
Malinin during his free skate at the 2024 World Championships

Malinin defended his title at 2024 U.S. Nationals, placing first in both the short and long program. The skater revealed he had been "struggling" with his new boots over the past few weeks in training. "The main problem was just the boots,” he explained after the free skate. “I mean, not even just today, this whole week. It was just my main concern and just going into this competition, I wasn’t really sure how I was going to perform."

At the 2024 World Championships in Montreal, Canada, Malinin's score of 105.97 put him in third place following the short program. In the free program, Malinin successfully performed six quadruple jumps, including two in combination, plus a triple Lutz-triple Axel sequence. He won the free program with a world record score of 227.79, earning the World title with a total score of 333.76. Malinin said: "I'm in shock right now. It means so much to me. I am so glad to be here and be here on top right now."

==== 2024–25 season: Second consecutive World champion and Grand Prix Final gold ====
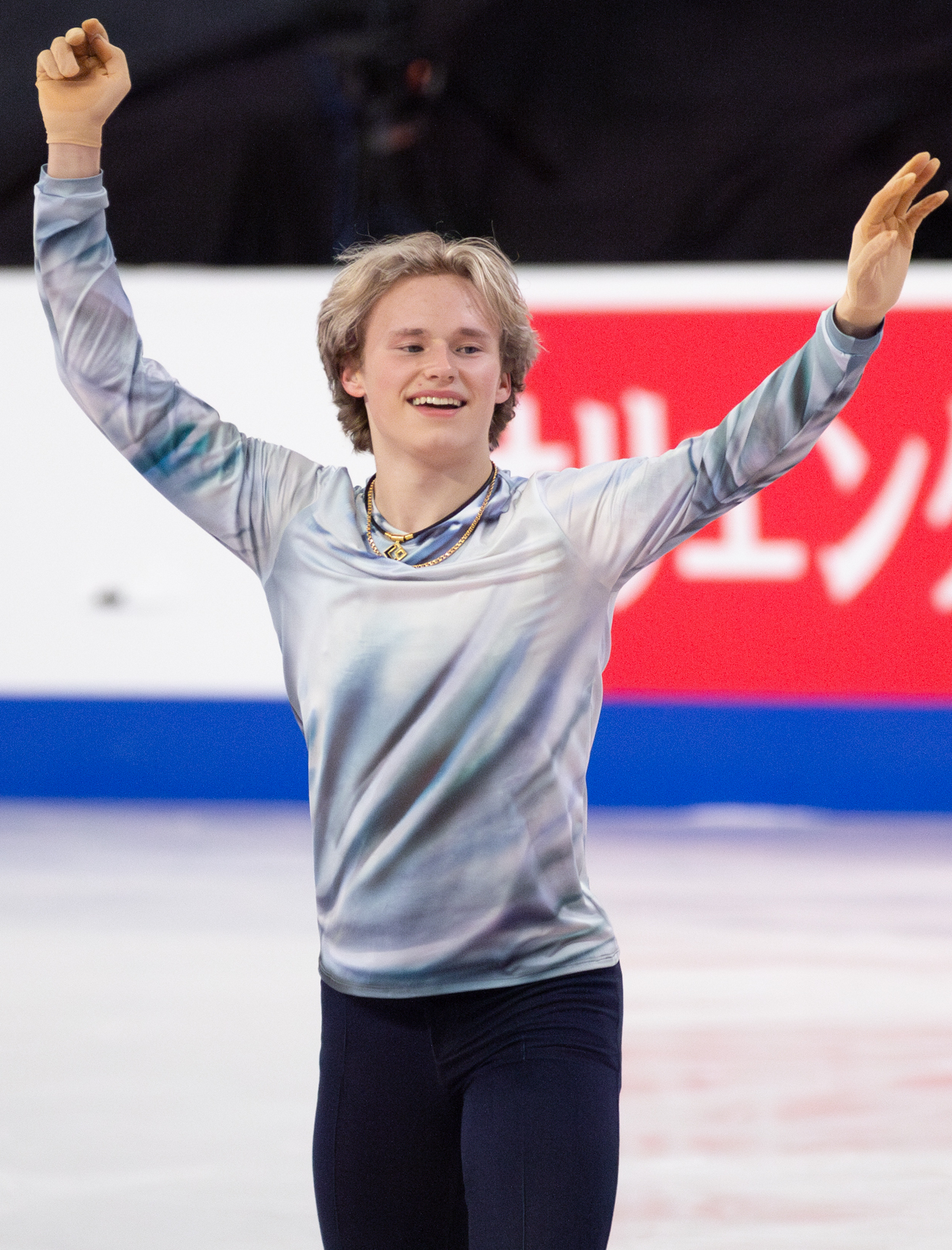
Malinin after his short program at 2024 Skate Canada International

Malinin opened his season at the 2024 Lombardia Trophy. He performed a clean short program, breaking the 100-point barrier in his very first competition of the season. In the free skate, he broke the 200-point barrier and the 300-point barrier overall, winning the gold medal.

Going on to compete on the 2024–25 Grand Prix series, Malinin won the 2024 Skate America. He said after the free skate,

"I always try to remind myself that these things happen, and you have to push through. Being the World Champion puts a lot of extra pressure on me, and I need to learn how to handle that."

One week later, he competed at the 2024 Skate Canada International, winning that event as well and securing a spot at the ISU Grand Prix Final. Malinin said,

"It was very tough doing these two back-to-back Grand Prix. Overall, I am pretty satisfied with my performance and how I was able to manage this today. You know, I’m a little bit bummed out with the loop, because I took the few days after Skate America to really make sure that this wouldn’t happen. But it is what it is. I just had to push it aside and continue the rest of the program.”

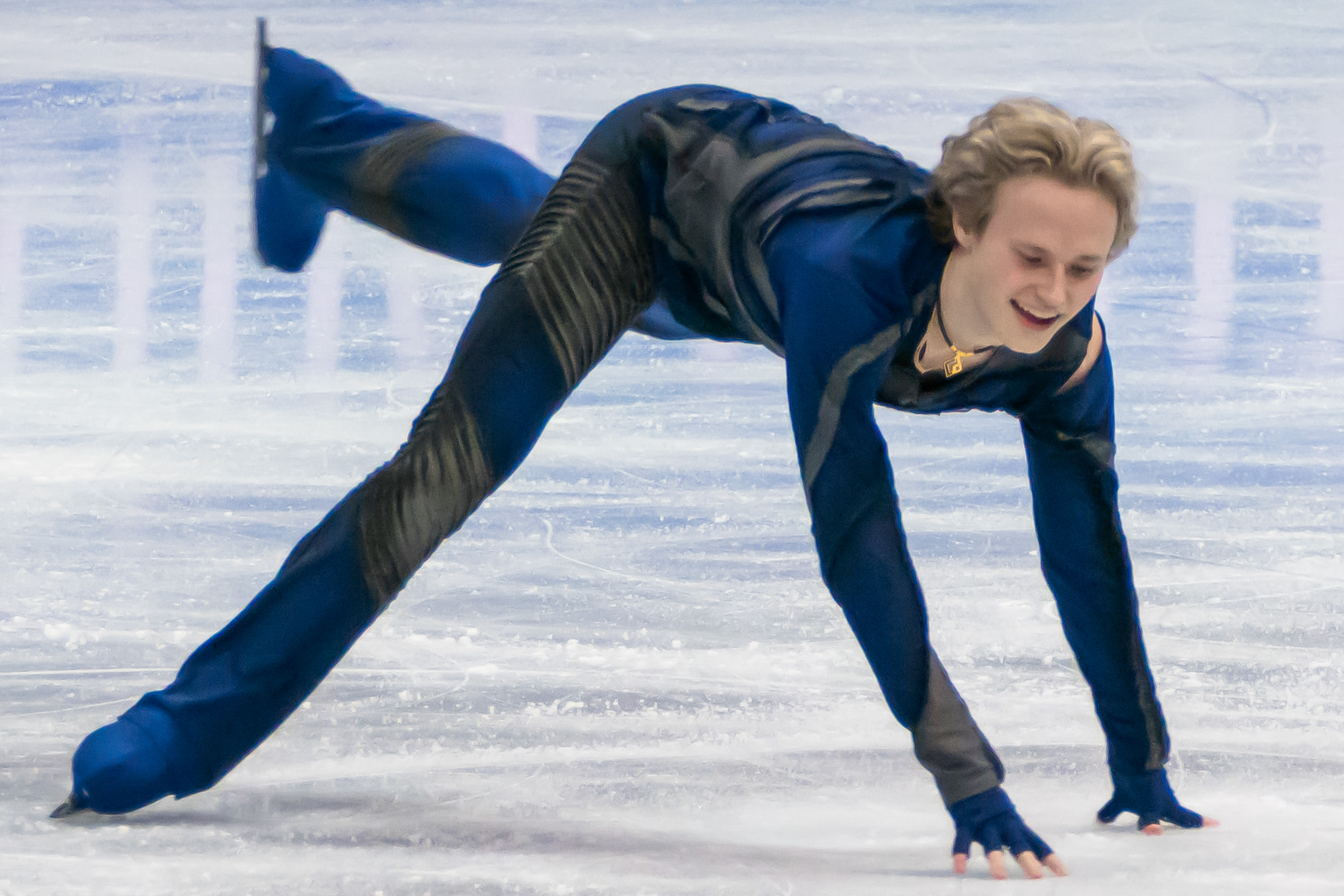
Malinin performing his short program at the 2025 World Championships

In December 2024, Malinin won the Grand Prix Final for a second consecutive time. He scored 105.43 and secured first place in the short program. In his free skate, he attempted seven quadruple jumps. He fell on one of his two quadruple Lutzes. He landed all of his other quadruple jumps, including a quadruple Axel. His free skate earned 186.69 points, bringing his total score to 292.12 to secure the gold medal. With his free skate, Malinin became the first figure skater to land all six types of quadruple jumps in one program, although none received positive grades of execution. Malinin said after the free skate that his main goal was to "clean everything" up and that he would decide if he should lower the quad count. “I will get home and play around with the elements and will figure out what the content for Worlds is going to be,” said Malinin. “I feel pretty good. It was not what I wanted but I am still proud of myself.

In January 2025, Malinin competed in the 2025 U.S. Championships. He scored 114.08 in the short program. In his free skate, he attempted all six types of quadruple jumps, but fell on his attempted quadruple loop. He expressed frustration in not landing this jump, saying, "one of my main goals coming here was to finally land that quad loop this season. I think it’s given me kind of a feedback of what I want to do in terms of leading up to the next competition or future seasons." His free skate earned him 219.23 points, bringing his total score to 333.31 and securing his third consecutive national title.

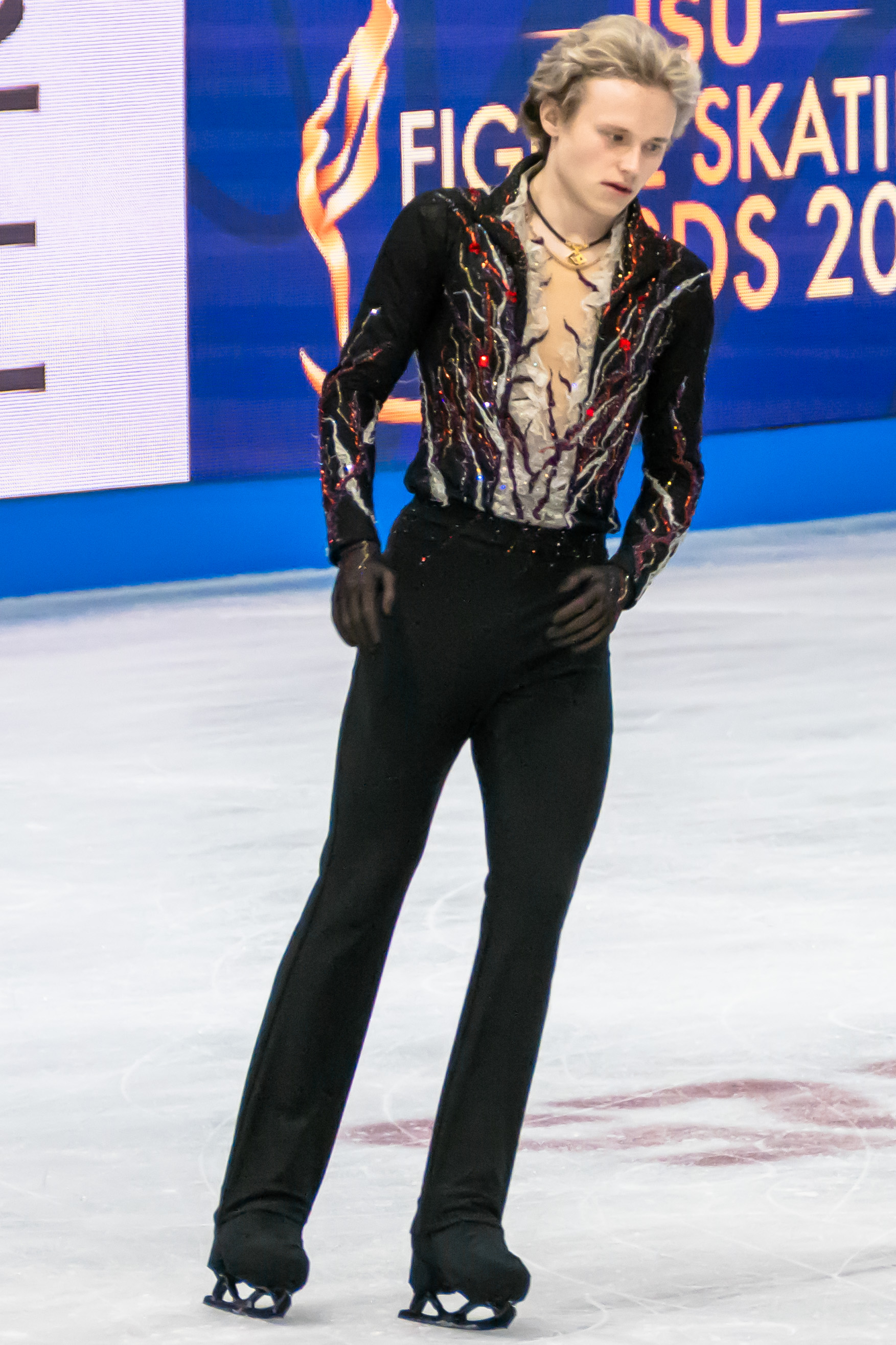
Malinin before his free skate at the 2025 World Championships

On March 2, 2025, Malinin took part in Legacy on Ice, an ice show organized by U.S. Figure Skating that paid tribute to lives lost aboard American Airlines Flight 5342.

Later in March, Malinin won the gold medal at the 2025 World Championships in Boston, marking his second consecutive World title. He ranked first in the short program with a personal best score of 110.41 and first in the free skate with a score of 208.14. He skated cleanly in the short program. In the free skate, he again landed all six types of jumps – toe loop, Salchow, loop, flip, Lutz, and Axel – as quadruples in a single program in competition. During the gala, Malinin dedicated his performance, To Build a Home by The Cinematic Orchestra, to the victims and first responders of the American Airlines Flight 5342 crash.

Selected to compete for Team United States at the 2025 World Team Trophy, Malinin won all competition segments of the men's singles event, aiding Team United States in securing the gold medal overall. Malinin said, "I was just lucky to be at this event and having this atmosphere with all my teammates, all my friends cheering me on. It was still very fun even though it was a bit tricky to get through the whole program."

==== 2025–26 season: Milano Cortina Olympics team gold, third consecutive World champion and Grand Prix Final gold, new world record ====
Malinin opened his season with a win at 2025 CS Lombardia Trophy in September.

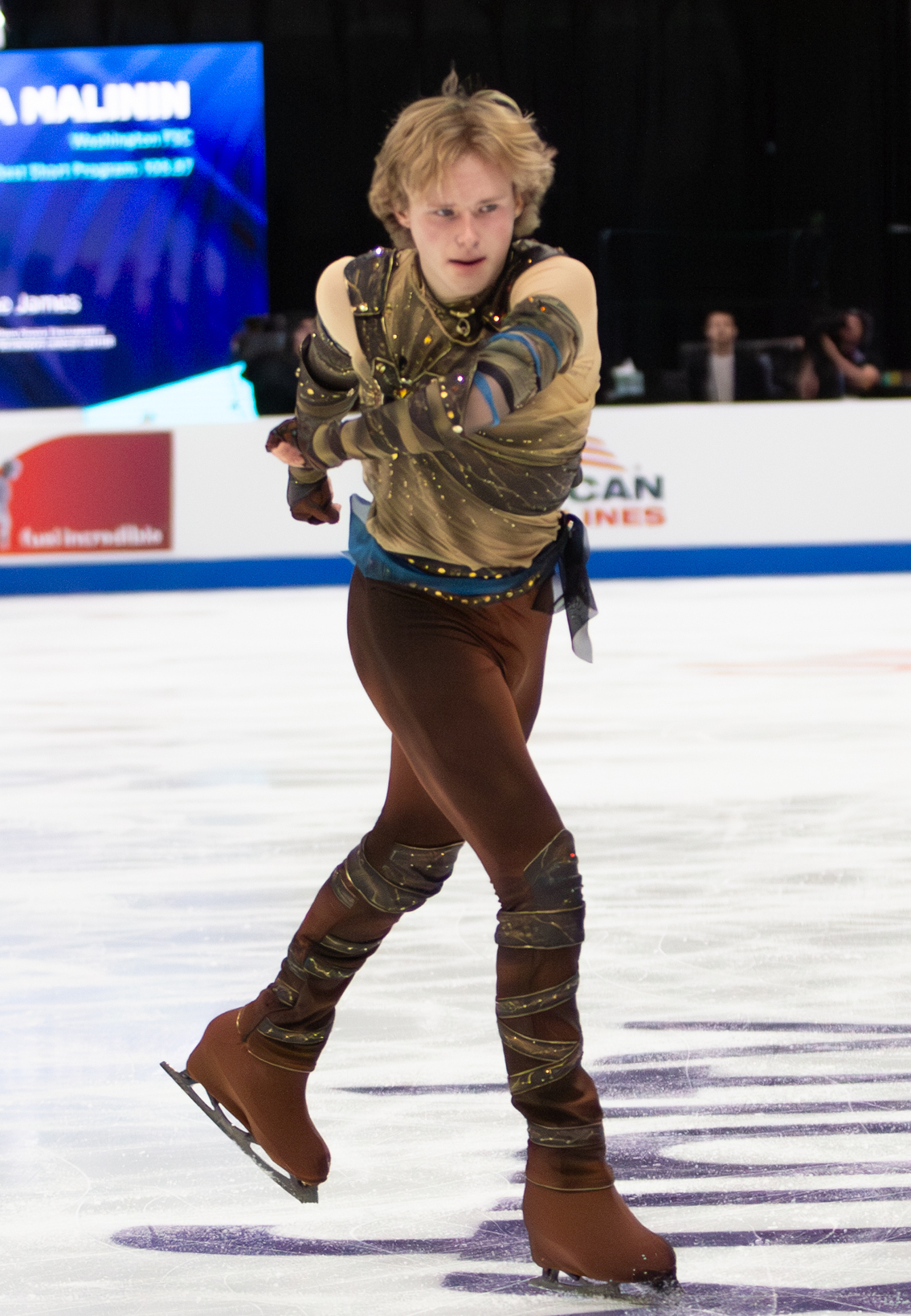
Malinin during his short program at the 2026 U.S. Championships

The following month, he took his sixth individual Grand Prix gold at 2025 Grand Prix de France. He said, "Right now, I feel very confident and happy with how things went. I did feel very nervous going out there. The goal was simply to make it to the end in one piece."

At 2025 Skate Canada International, Malinin broke his own record in the free skate with a score of 228.97, finishing with a personal-best total of 333.81. After the performance, he stated "it wasn't perfect" and that he hoped to push the record even higher. "It almost felt like I was on autopilot and everything was just happening one element after the other", he said.

A month later, Malinin competed at and won the 2025–26 Grand Prix Final, his third consecutive title at this event. He earned a new personal best and record score of 238.24 points in the free skate, in which he landed a record of seven clean quadruple jumps. "For me, the Grand Prix Final is a place for me to try new things and new elements, new layouts", he explained. "To give myself an understanding what is possible, especially for this year for the Olympics. So, I decided that I wanted to go full out and give myself like a foundation of what it would look like."

In January, Malinin won his fourth straight national title at the 2026 U.S. Figure Skating Championships. He was placed first in both the short and long program and finished with a total score of 324.88 points. The skater said he was breaking in a new pair of boots, and therefore decided to "play it safe" in the long program with fewer quad jumps. "It's not completely out of the ordinary, but seeing as these nationals were closer because of the Olympics, I didn't have a lot of time to get comfortable with them." He was subsequently named to the 2026 Winter Olympic team. Before heading to the Olympic Games, Russian hockey player Alexander Ovechkin gifted Malinin with a set of his signature yellow laces to wear to the event.

On February 7, Malinin placed second in the short program in the 2026 Winter Olympics Figure Skating Team Event behind Japan's Yuma Kagiyama. The following day, he placed first in the free program despite stepping out of a quad Lutz attempt and failing to perform a quad Lutz jump combination, securing gold for the United States in the team event. "I really went out there and just decided, okay, let the nerves down", he said after the free skate. ”You just really need to get in that zone, you really just let things happen. And I’m proud of myself. I’m proud of my team, for all the work they’ve put in. We wouldn’t have gotten this gold medal without any of them.” In the men's singles event, which Malinin was heavily favored to win, he placed first in the short program after successfully performing a quadruple flip, triple Axel, and quadruple Lutz-triple toe loop combination. However, he struggled in the free skate: he performed a single Axel, double loop, and double Salchow in place of a planned quadruple Axel, quadruple loop, and quadruple Salchow respectively; he also fell on a repeated quadruple Lutz and again on the double Salchow. He finished in fifteenth place in the segment and eighth place overall.

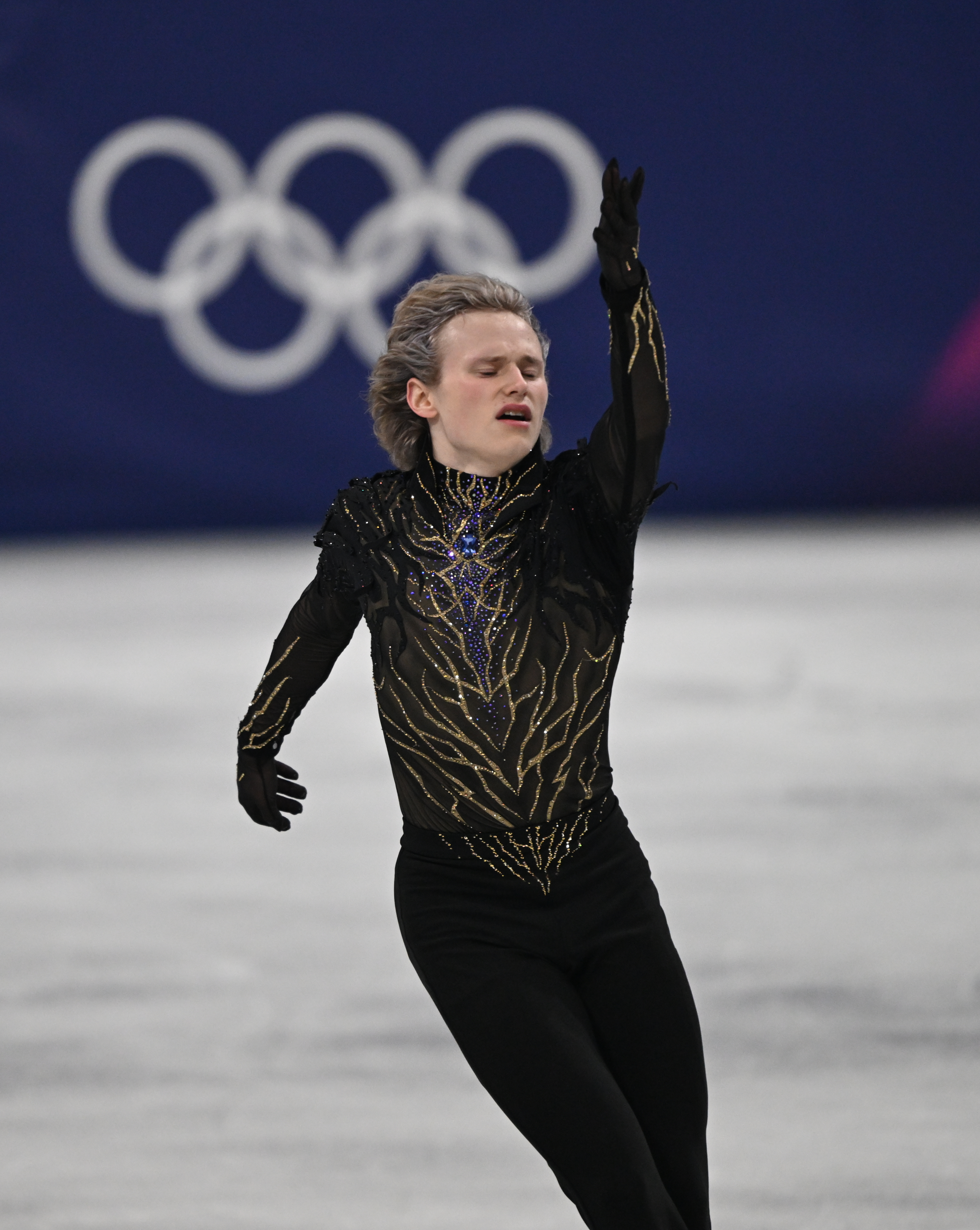
Malinin performing his free program at the 2026 Winter Olympics

Malinin said after the event that he struggled with the pressure of being the Olympic gold medal favorite and that his mistakes were "definitely mental", stating "Honestly, I still haven't been able to process what just happened, it's a lot of mixed emotions [...] it's not like any other competition. It's the Olympics, and I think people only realize the pressure in the nerves that actually happen from the inside, so it was really just something that overwhelmed me and I just felt like I had no control." After Malinin received his scores and it was announced that Mikhail Shaidorov of Kazakhstan had won the gold medal, Malinin hugged and congratulated him. "I watched him skate from the locker room and I'm just so proud of him," Malinin said afterward. "We're all in this sport together, and we're there for each other. That’s what makes this sport special. I think people forget that sometimes. They only see us competing and assume we’re rivals without good relationships. But it's actually the opposite. There’s joy, motivation, encouragement; we're like a big family."

On 16 February 2026, Malinin posted a video on social media juxtaposing images of his previous victories with images of himself visibly distressed. In the accompanying caption, he discussed the pressures of Olympic competition and what he described as "vile online hatred", saying that the accumulated pressure had resulted in an "inevitable crash". At the Olympic exhibition gala on 21 February, Malinin performed to "Fear" by NF. The routine depicted social media scrutiny, public criticism, and the pressures of competition. The program had been developed months before the Games with choreographer Randi Strong, but Malinin said its themes resonated with his experience at the Olympics.

In March, Malinin completed his season by winning the 2026 World Championships, marking his third consecutive world championship title. He finished first in both the short program and free skate and set a new personal best score of 111.29 in the short program. After the short program Malinin said,

"It felt really great just being out there. That's one thing that I really wanted—to enjoy. I had no expectations coming into the event. I simply wanted to go. I'm really relieved that this season is finally done after really long ups and downs the whole season. I'm very glad to be here at the World Championships and it was a different change of mindset to come here."

=== 2026–27 season: Fourth Skate America title ===
Following the 2026 Winter Olympics, Malinin began using the nickname "Chaos God" alongside "Quad God", explaining that it helped him distance himself from the expectations associated with his original nickname. He also introduced "Vision 2030", a four-year personal development plan encompassing his goals in skating, business, and personal life.

For his new short program, Malinin selected music from Karl Jenkins's Cantata Memoria and dedicated the performance to victims of the January 2025 mid-air collision near Washington, D.C., which killed 28 members of the U.S. figure skating community, including people affiliated with his skating club, the Washington Figure Skating Club. His free skate was set to music from the animated series Blue Eye Samurai.

On 11 October 2026, Malinin was formally presented with the Milano Cortina 2026 Fair Play Award at the Olympic Museum in Lausanne, Switzerland. The award recognized his sportsmanship in congratulating Mikhail Shaidorov after Shaidorov won the Olympic men's individual title and Malinin finished eighth. Malinin also donated the costume he wore for his short program in the Olympic team event, in which the United States won gold, to the Olympic Museum.

Malinin made his season debut at 2026 Skate America, winning his fourth title at the event with 284.31 points. He placed first in the short program and second in the free skate, finishing ahead of silver medalist Daniel Grassl. In the free skate, he omitted his signature quadruple Axel and attempted four quadruple jumps, placing greater emphasis on musical interpretation and presentation. Afterward, Malinin said he felt more connected to the music and audience than in previous seasons, citing his efforts to develop his emotional and artistic expression.

== Skating style and influences ==
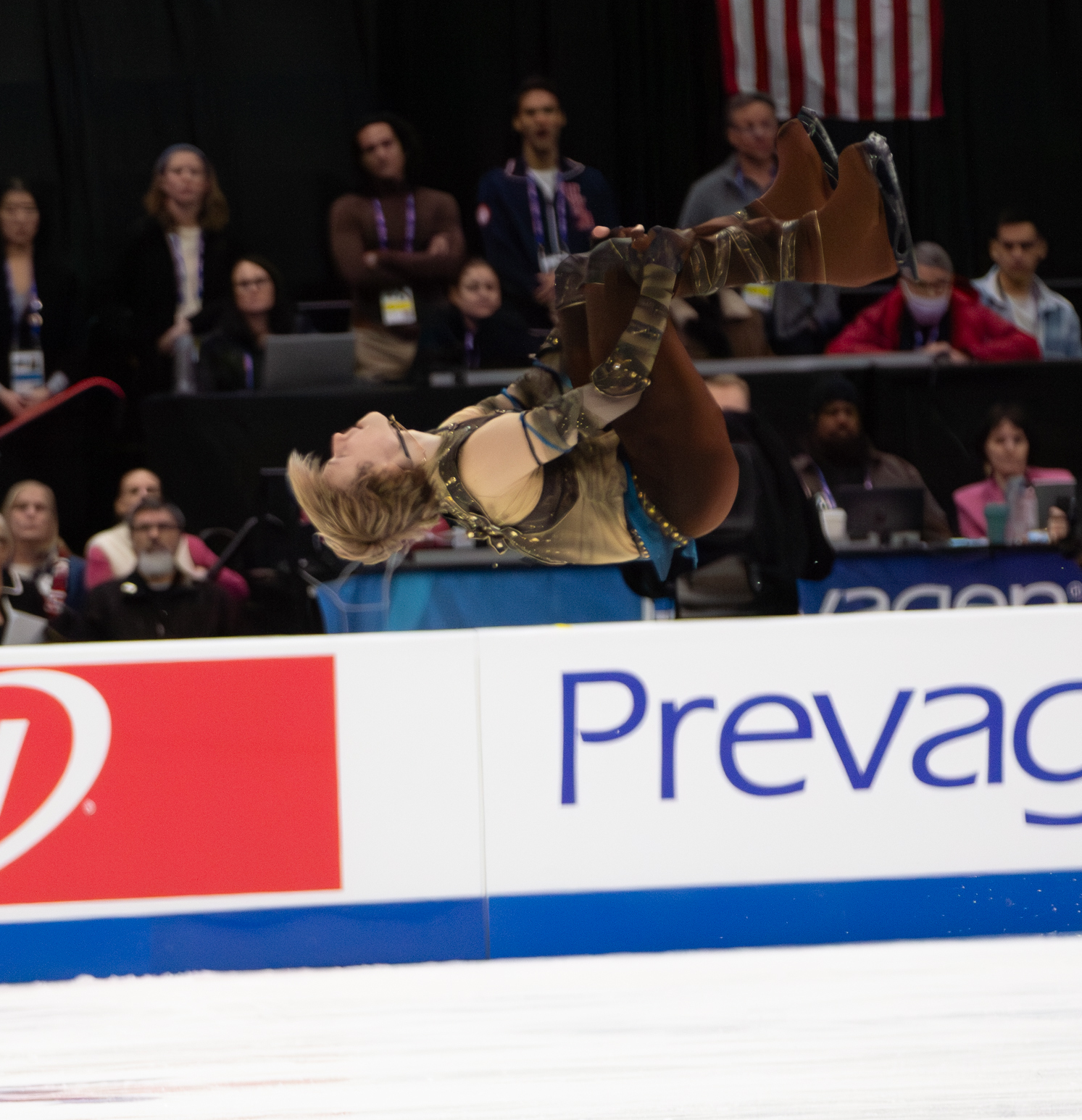
Malinin performing a backflip at the 2026 U.S. Championships

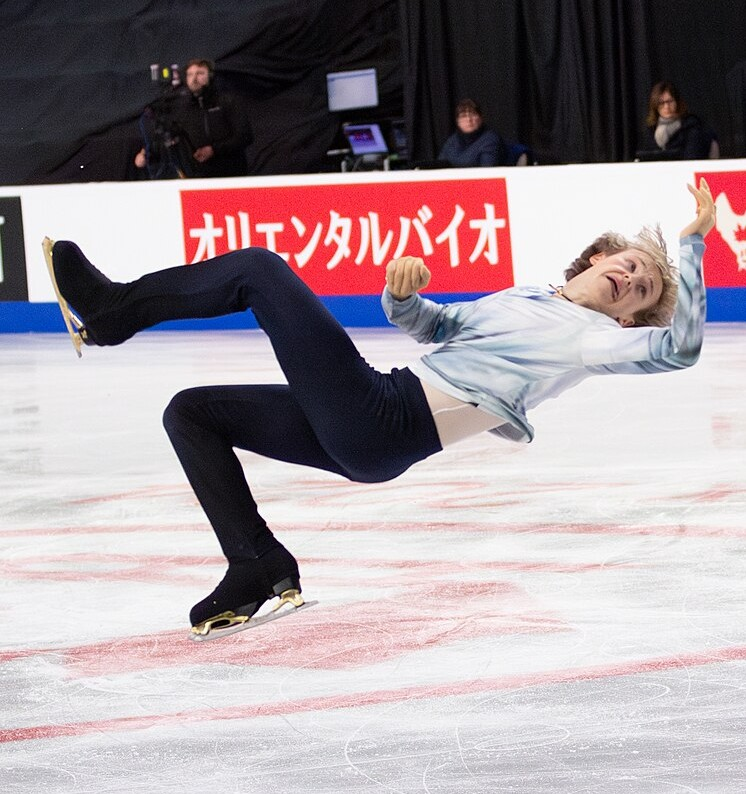
Malinin performing his signature "Raspberry Twist" at 2024 Skate Canada International

Skaters whom Malinin has cited as inspirations include Nathan Chen, Yuzuru Hanyu, Mikhail Kolyada, Evgeni Plushenko, and his mother Tatiana Malinina. In addition to being known for his ability to land a wide array of quadruple jumps, Malinin is also able to perform on-ice backflips, which he added to his competitive programs during the 2024–25 season following the decision by the International Skating Union to lift the ban on them.

Malinin is also credited for introducing a unique choreographic move where he uses a "butterfly" entrance to propel his body into the air before performing a single sideways twist. He calls this maneuver the "Raspberry Twist," since his last name is derived from malina, meaning "raspberry" in Russian.

Malinin's emphasis on technical difficulty initially drew attention to the difference between his technical and program component scores. At the 2023 World Championships, he received the highest technical element score in the men's free skate but ranked eleventh in program components, which assess composition, presentation and skating skills. By the 2023–24 season, he was working with choreographer Shae-Lynn Bourne to refine his spins, step sequences, jump landings and the flow between elements. He also credited a modern and contemporary dance course at George Mason University with improving his flexibility, coordination and body lines.

Malinin has described his preferred skating style as contemporary and theatrical, incorporating music and movements intended to appeal to audiences beyond traditional figure skating followers. His programs have featured music by NF, Falling in Reverse and the television series Succession. He has said that incorporating modern music and acrobatic elements is partly intended to attract younger audiences to the sport. His 2024–25 short program to "Running" by NF, choreographed by Bourne, received the International Skating Union's Most Entertaining Program award in 2025.

Malinin became increasingly involved in developing the artistic concepts of his programs. His 2025–26 free skate, "A Voice", incorporated spoken-word passages recorded by Malinin himself, with the wording developed in collaboration with Bourne and writer-director Bohdan Turok. Malinin described the program as reflecting his personal experiences and the process of overcoming difficulties. He has also choreographed some of his own exhibition programs. Bourne said that their work aimed to create a stronger emotional connection with audiences rather than relying solely on the difficulty of his jumps.

== Honors and awards ==
- Entered Guinness World Records after landing the first quadruple Axel in competition and again after getting the highest score in figure skating in the men's long program.
- Time, 2022 Time 100 Next list
- ISU Skating Awards 2023, Special Achievement Award
- Honored with a resolution by the Fairfax County Board of Supervisors "for his national and international ice skating accomplishments"
- ISU Skating Awards 2024, Most Valuable Skater
- Skating Magazine, 2024 Readers' Choice Award
- USA Today, List of athletes set to become breakout stars in 2025
- ISU Skating Awards 2025, Skater of the Year, Most Entertaining Program
- 2026 Winter Olympics, Fair Play Award
- ISU Trailblazer on Ice Award 2026, in recognition of his "record-breaking feat to land seven quadruple jumps in a single program"
- ISU Figure Skating Awards 2026, Best Costume
- Time, 2026 Time 100 Sports list
- Skating Magazine, 2026 Readers' Choice Award

== World record scores ==
Combined total records
Disc.	Segment	Score	Event	Date	Ref.
Men's singles (Junior)	Free skate	187.12	2022 World Junior Championships	April 16, 2022	
Men's singles (Junior)	Combined total	276.11	2022 World Junior Championships	April 16, 2022	
Men's singles (Senior)	Free skate	238.24	2025–26 Grand Prix Final	December 6, 2025	

== Programs ==
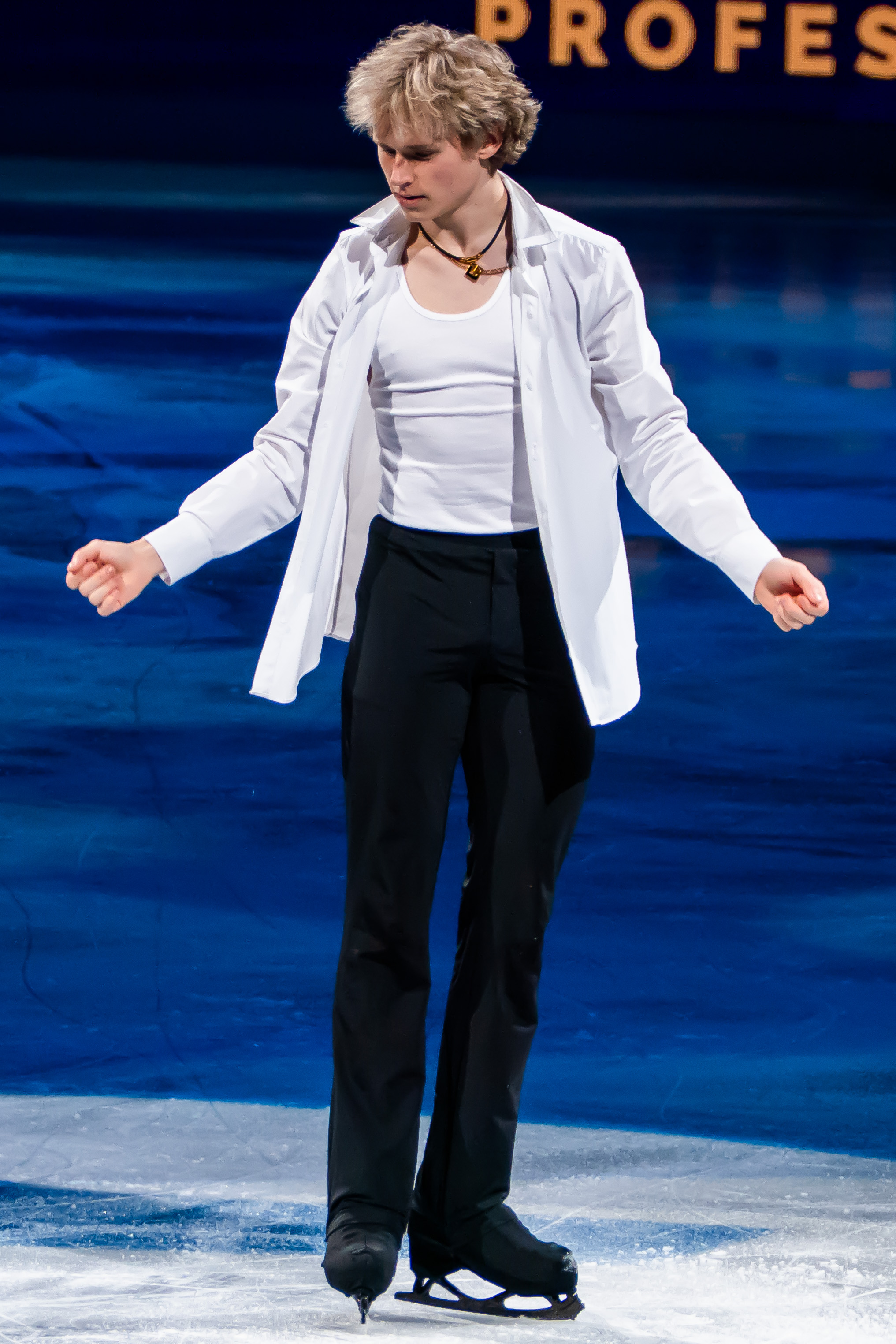
Malinin during his exhibition program at the 2025 World Championships

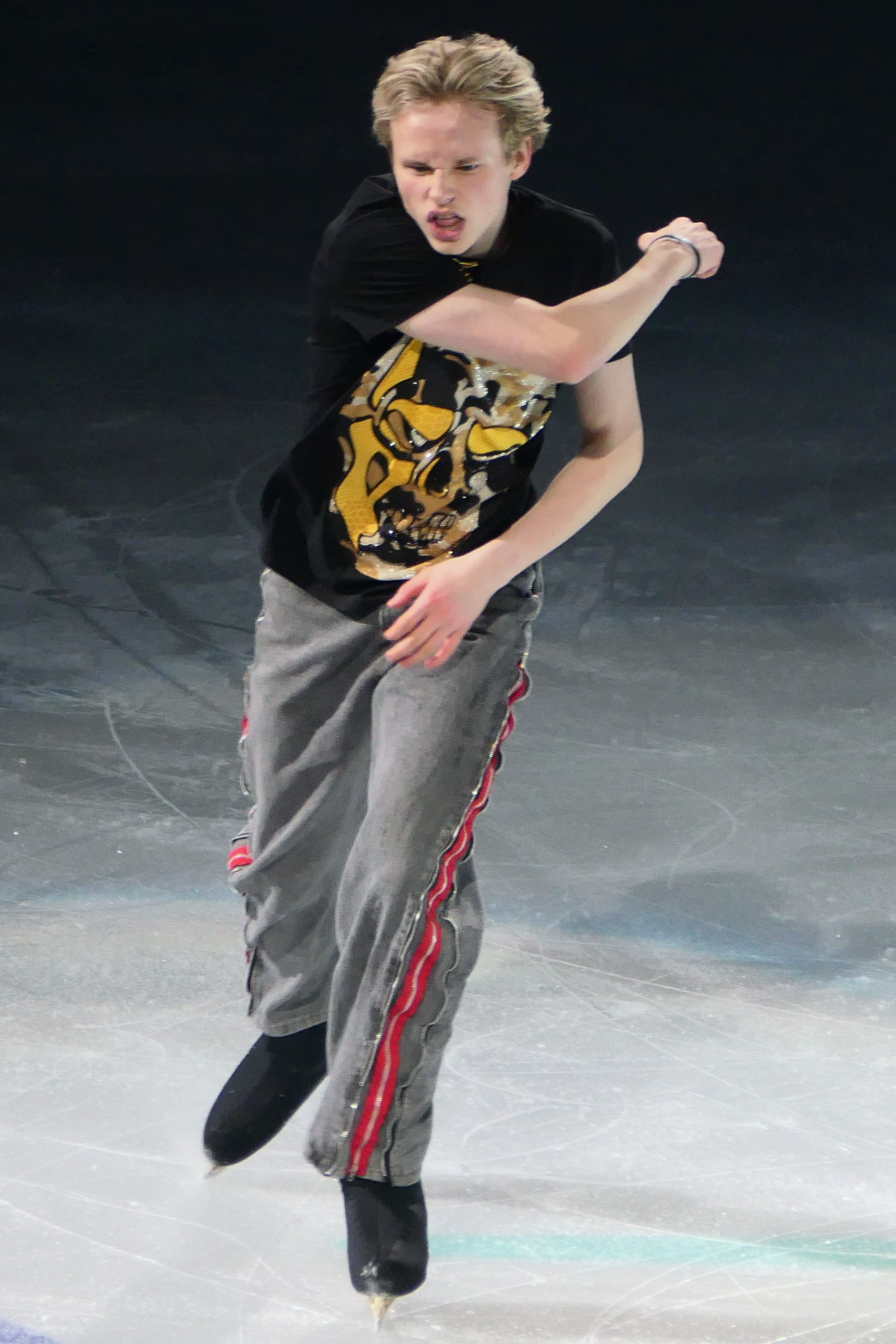
Malinin during his exhibition program at the 2024 World Championships

- Program details mentioned at first occurrence

Competition and exhibition programs by season
Season	Short program	Free skate program	Exhibition program
2019–20	"Make It Rain": From Sons of Anarchy; Performed by Ed Sheeran; Choreo. by Tatiana Malinina	"Writing's on the Wall": From Spectre; Performed by Sam Smith; Choreo. by Tatiana Malinina	—N/a
2020–21	"Billie Jean": Performed by David Cook; Choreo. by Irina Romanova	Medley: 1. "Nobody Knows"; Performed by Autograf; 2. "The Golden Age"; Performed by Woodkid; Choreo. by Viktor Pfeifer	"When I Grow Up": Performed by NF
2021–22	"Billie Jean"	Medley: 1. "Nobody Knows"; 2. "The Golden Age"	"Make It Rain": From Sons of Anarchy; Performed by Ed Sheeran; Choreo. by Tatiana Malinina
2022–23	"I Put a Spell On You": Performed by Garou; Choreo. by Shae-Lynn Bourne	Euphoria: 1. "The Lake"; 2. "I'm Tired"; 3. "Mount Everest"; Performed by Labrinth; Choreo. by Juris Razgulajevs	"Jealous": Performed by Labrinth
2022–23	"I Put a Spell On You": Performed by Garou; Choreo. by Shae-Lynn Bourne	Euphoria: 1. "The Lake"; 2. "I'm Tired"; 3. "Mount Everest"; Performed by Labrinth; Choreo. by Juris Razgulajevs	"The Search": Performed by NF
2022–23	"I Put a Spell On You": Performed by Garou; Choreo. by Shae-Lynn Bourne	Euphoria: 1. "The Lake"; 2. "I'm Tired"; 3. "Mount Everest"; Performed by Labrinth; Choreo. by Juris Razgulajevs	"All You Ever Wanted": Performed by Rag'n'Bone Man
2023–24	"Malagueña": Composed by Ernesto Lecuona; Performed by Benise; Choreo. by Shae-Lynn Bourne	Succession: 1. "Andante Agitato - End Credits - "The Raid""; 2. "Andante Con Moto - String Orchestra Version"; Composed by Nicholas Britell; 3. Succession Main Title; Composed by Nicholas Britell; Performed by Katherine Cordova; 4. "Andante Moderato – End Credits – "Amen""; 5. "Strings Con Fuoco"; Composed by Nicholas Britell; Choreo. by Shae-Lynn Bourne	"All You Ever Wanted"
2023–24	"Malagueña": Composed by Ernesto Lecuona; Performed by Benise; Choreo. by Shae-Lynn Bourne	Succession: 1. "Andante Agitato - End Credits - "The Raid""; 2. "Andante Con Moto - String Orchestra Version"; Composed by Nicholas Britell; 3. Succession Main Title; Composed by Nicholas Britell; Performed by Katherine Cordova; 4. "Andante Moderato – End Credits – "Amen""; 5. "Strings Con Fuoco"; Composed by Nicholas Britell; Choreo. by Shae-Lynn Bourne	"Tout l'univers": Performed by Gjon's Tears
2023–24	"Malagueña": Composed by Ernesto Lecuona; Performed by Benise; Choreo. by Shae-Lynn Bourne	Succession: 1. "Andante Agitato - End Credits - "The Raid""; 2. "Andante Con Moto - String Orchestra Version"; Composed by Nicholas Britell; 3. Succession Main Title; Composed by Nicholas Britell; Performed by Katherine Cordova; 4. "Andante Moderato – End Credits – "Amen""; 5. "Strings Con Fuoco"; Composed by Nicholas Britell; Choreo. by Shae-Lynn Bourne	"I Got You": Performed by James Brown
2023–24	"Malagueña": Composed by Ernesto Lecuona; Performed by Benise; Choreo. by Shae-Lynn Bourne	Succession: 1. "Andante Agitato - End Credits - "The Raid""; 2. "Andante Con Moto - String Orchestra Version"; Composed by Nicholas Britell; 3. Succession Main Title; Composed by Nicholas Britell; Performed by Katherine Cordova; 4. "Andante Moderato – End Credits – "Amen""; 5. "Strings Con Fuoco"; Composed by Nicholas Britell; Choreo. by Shae-Lynn Bourne	"Hope": Performed by NF
2024–25	"Running": Performed by NF; Choreo. by Shae-Lynn Bourne	"I'm Not a Vampire (Revamped)": Performed by Falling in Reverse; Choreo. by Shae-Lynn Bourne	"Cage of Bones": Performed by Son Lux; Choreo. by Ilia Malinin
2024–25	"Running": Performed by NF; Choreo. by Shae-Lynn Bourne	"I'm Not a Vampire (Revamped)": Performed by Falling in Reverse; Choreo. by Shae-Lynn Bourne	"Lovely": Performed by Billie Eilish, Khalid; Choreo. by Ilia Malinin
2024–25	"Running": Performed by NF; Choreo. by Shae-Lynn Bourne	"I'm Not a Vampire (Revamped)": Performed by Falling in Reverse; Choreo. by Shae-Lynn Bourne	"Future Rain": Performed by Don Diablo & Tony Ann
2024–25	"Running": Performed by NF; Choreo. by Shae-Lynn Bourne	"I'm Not a Vampire (Revamped)": Performed by Falling in Reverse; Choreo. by Shae-Lynn Bourne	"Hope": Performed by NF; Choreo. by Ilia Malinin
2024–25	"Running": Performed by NF; Choreo. by Shae-Lynn Bourne	"I'm Not a Vampire (Revamped)": Performed by Falling in Reverse; Choreo. by Shae-Lynn Bourne	"No Time to Die": Performed by Billie Eilish; Choreo. by Ilia Malinin
2024–25	"Running": Performed by NF; Choreo. by Shae-Lynn Bourne	"I'm Not a Vampire (Revamped)": Performed by Falling in Reverse; Choreo. by Shae-Lynn Bourne	"To Build a Home": Performed by The Cinematic Orchestra; Choreo. by Ilia Malinin
2025–26	"The Lost Crown": 1. Dies Irae; Performed by náttúra, Vila; 2. The Lost Crown (Prince of Persia); Performed by 2WEI, Joznez, Kataem; Choreo. by Shae-Lynn Bourne	"A Voice": 1. The Ball; From Le Bal des folles; Composed by Asaf Avidan; 2. The Smell of the Sea; Composed by Alan Mayer; 3. Code Duello; Composed by Power-Haus, Sergiu-Dan Muresan; Choreo. by Shae-Lynn Bourne	"I Was Made for Lovin' You": Performed by Yungblud, Dominic Lewis
2025–26	"The Lost Crown": 1. Dies Irae; Performed by náttúra, Vila; 2. The Lost Crown (Prince of Persia); Performed by 2WEI, Joznez, Kataem; Choreo. by Shae-Lynn Bourne	"A Voice": 1. The Ball; From Le Bal des folles; Composed by Asaf Avidan; 2. The Smell of the Sea; Composed by Alan Mayer; 3. Code Duello; Composed by Power-Haus, Sergiu-Dan Muresan; Choreo. by Shae-Lynn Bourne	"Hold On Tight": Performed by Thomas Azier
2025–26	"The Lost Crown": 1. Dies Irae; Performed by náttúra, Vila; 2. The Lost Crown (Prince of Persia); Performed by 2WEI, Joznez, Kataem; Choreo. by Shae-Lynn Bourne	"A Voice": 1. The Ball; From Le Bal des folles; Composed by Asaf Avidan; 2. The Smell of the Sea; Composed by Alan Mayer; 3. Code Duello; Composed by Power-Haus, Sergiu-Dan Muresan; Choreo. by Shae-Lynn Bourne	"NF Medley": 1. Running; 2. Mansion ft. Fleurie; 3. Hope; Performed by NF
2025–26	"The Lost Crown": 1. Dies Irae; Performed by náttúra, Vila; 2. The Lost Crown (Prince of Persia); Performed by 2WEI, Joznez, Kataem; Choreo. by Shae-Lynn Bourne	"A Voice": 1. The Ball; From Le Bal des folles; Composed by Asaf Avidan; 2. The Smell of the Sea; Composed by Alan Mayer; 3. Code Duello; Composed by Power-Haus, Sergiu-Dan Muresan; Choreo. by Shae-Lynn Bourne	"Fear": Performed by NF
2026–27	"Cantata Memoria – For the Children": Performed by Karl Jenkins; Choreo. by Shae-Lynn Bourne	"Blue Eye Samurai (soundtrack)": Performed by Amie Doherty; Choreo. by Shae-Lynn Bourne	—N/a

== Competitive highlights ==
- GP – ISU Grand Prix Series
- JGP – ISU Junior Grand Prix Series
- CS – ISU Challenger Series
- TBD – To be decided
- WD – Withdrew
- C – Event cancelled
- Medals at team events are awarded for team results only. Individual placements at team events are listed in parentheses.

Competition placements at senior level
Season	2020–21	2021–22	2022–23	2023–24	2024–25	2025–26	2026–27
Winter Olympics						8th	
Winter Olympics (Team event)						1st	
World Championships		9th	3rd	1st	1st	1st	
Grand Prix Final			3rd	1st	1st	1st	
U.S. Championships		2nd	1st	1st	1st	1st	
World Team Trophy			1st (2nd)		1st (1st)		
GP Finland			1st				
GP France				2nd		1st	
GP NHK Trophy							TBD
GP Skate America	5th		1st	1st	1st		1st
GP Skate Canada					1st	1st	
CS Autumn Classic				1st			
CS Cup of Austria		3rd					
CS Lombardia Trophy					1st	1st	
CS U.S. Classic			1st				
Challenge Cup		1st					
Japan Open			2nd (2nd)	2nd (1st)			

Competition placements at junior level
Season	2019–20	2021–22
World Junior Championships	16th	1st
Junior Grand Prix Final		C
JGP Austria		1st
JGP France		1st
JGP Italy	7th	
JGP United States	4th	
Philadelphia Summer	7th	

== Detailed results ==
ISU personal best scores in the +5/-5 GOE System
Segment	Type	Score	Event
Total	TSS	333.81	2025 Skate Canada International
Short program	TSS	111.29	2026 World Championships
Short program	TES	65.05	2026 World Championships
Short program	PCS	46.36	2024–25 Grand Prix Final
Free skating	TSS	238.24	2025–26 Grand Prix Final
Free skating	TES	146.07	2025–26 Grand Prix Final
Free skating	PCS	95.04	2026 World Championships

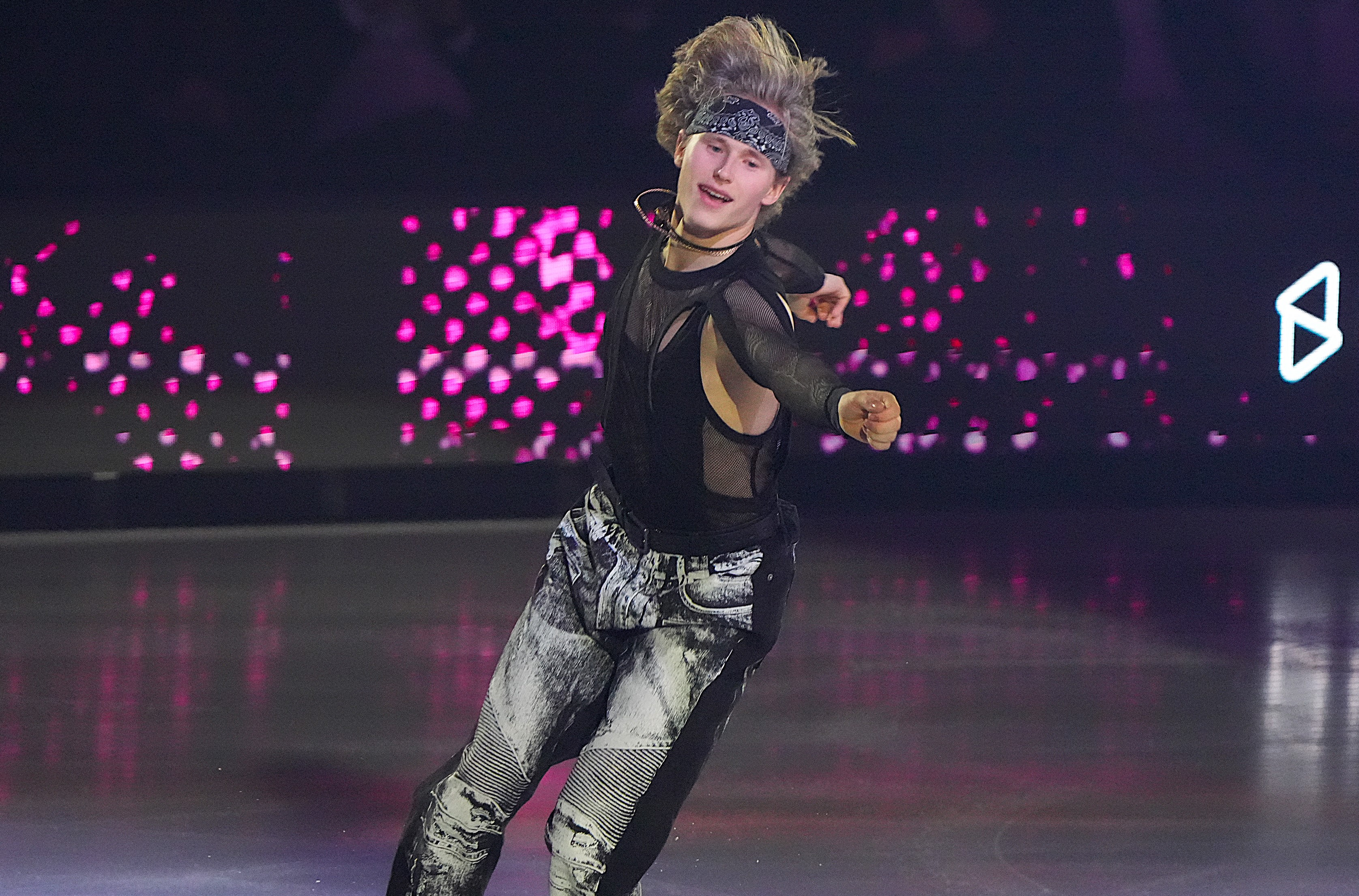
Ilia Malinin at Art on Ice 2026 in Zurich.

- Small medals for the short program and free skating are only awarded at ISU Championships.
- Medals at team events are awarded for the team results only. Individual placements at team events are listed in parentheses.

=== Senior level ===
Results in the 2020–21 season
Date	Event	SP		FS		Total	
Date	Event	P	Score	P	Score	P	Score
Oct 23–24, 2020	(United States) 2020 Skate America	7	76.75	5	143.56	5	220.31

Results in the 2021–22 season
Date	Event	SP		FS		Total	
Date	Event	P	Score	P	Score	P	Score
Nov 11–14, 2021	2021 CS Cup of Austria	13	67.58	2	154.97	3	222.55
Jan 3–9, 2022	(United States) 2022 U.S. Championships	3	103.46	2	199.02	2	302.48
Feb 24–27, 2022	(Netherlands) 2022 International Challenge Cup	2	84.55	1	176.14	1	260.69
Mar 21–27, 2022	(France) 2022 World Championships	4	100.16	11	163.63	9	263.79

Results in the 2022–23 season
Date	Event	SP		FS		Total	
Date	Event	P	Score	P	Score	P	Score
Sep 13–16, 2022	(United States) 2022 CS U.S. International Classic	6	71.84	1	185.44	1	257.28
Oct 8, 2022	2022 Japan Open	—N/a	—N/a	2	193.42	2	—N/a
Oct 21–23, 2022	(United States) 2022 Skate America	4	86.08	1	194.29	1	280.37
Nov 25–27, 2022	(Finland) 2022 Grand Prix of Espoo	2	85.57	1	192.82	1	278.39
Dec 8–11, 2022	(Italy) 2022–23 Grand Prix Final	5	80.10	2	191.84	3	271.94
Jan 23–29, 2023	(United States) 2023 U.S. Championships	1	110.36	2	177.38	1	287.74
Mar 22–26, 2023	(Japan) 2023 World Championships	2	100.38	3	188.06	3	288.44
Apr 13–16, 2023	(Japan) 2023 World Team Trophy	1	105.90	5	173.64	1 (2)	279.54

Results in the 2023–24 season
Date	Event	SP		FS		Total	
Date	Event	P	Score	P	Score	P	Score
Sep 14–16, 2023	(Canada) 2023 CS Autumn Classic International	1	100.87	1	180.81	1	281.68
Oct 8, 2023	2023 Japan Open	—N/a	—N/a	1	193.91	2	—N/a
Oct 20–22, 2023	(United States) 2023 Skate America	1	104.06	1	206.41	1	310.47
Nov 3–5, 2023	2023 Grand Prix de France	1	101.58	2	203.10	2	304.68
Dec 7–10, 2023	(China) 2023–24 Grand Prix Final	1	106.90	1	207.76	1	314.66
Jan 22–28, 2024	(United States) 2024 U.S. Championships	1	108.57	1	185.78	1	294.35
Mar 18–24, 2024	(Canada) 2024 World Championships	3	105.97	1	227.79	1	333.76

Results in the 2024–25 season
Date	Event	SP		FS		Total	
Date	Event	P	Score	P	Score	P	Score
Sep 12–15, 2024	(Italy) 2024 CS Lombardia Trophy	1	107.25	1	205.30	1	312.55
Oct 18–20, 2024	(United States) 2024 Skate America	1	99.69	2	190.43	1	290.12
Oct 25–27, 2024	2024 Skate Canada International	1	106.22	1	195.60	1	301.82
Dec 5–8, 2024	(France) 2024–25 Grand Prix Final	1	105.43	2	186.69	1	292.12
Jan 20–26, 2025	(United States) 2025 U.S. Championships	1	114.08	1	219.23	1	333.31
Mar 25–30, 2025	(United States) 2025 World Championships	1	110.41	1	208.15	1	318.56
Apr 17–20, 2025	(Japan) 2025 World Team Trophy	1	106.08	1	183.88	1 (1)	289.96

Results in the 2025–26 season
Date	Event	SP		FS		Total	
Date	Event	P	Score	P	Score	P	Score
Sep 11–14, 2025	(Italy) 2025 CS Lombardia Trophy	1	108.87	1	197.78	1	306.65
Oct 17–19, 2025	2025 Grand Prix de France	1	105.22	1	215.78	1	321.00
Oct 31 – Nov 2, 2025	2025 Skate Canada International	1	104.84	1	228.97	1	333.81
Dec 4–7, 2025	(Japan) 2025–26 Grand Prix Final	3	94.05	1	238.24	1	332.29
Jan 4–11, 2026	(United States) 2026 U.S. Championships	1	115.10	1	209.78	1	324.88
Feb 6–8, 2026	(Italy) 2026 Winter Olympics – Team event	2	98.00	1	200.03	1	—N/a
Feb 10–13, 2026	(Italy) 2026 Winter Olympics	1	108.16	15	156.33	8	264.49
Mar 24–29, 2026	(Czech Republic) 2026 World Championships	1	111.29	1	218.11	1	329.40

Results in the 2026–27 season
Date	Event	SP		FS		Total	
Date	Event	P	Score	P	Score	P	Score
Nov 13–15, 2026	(United States) 2026 Skate America	1	96.74	2	187.57	1	284.31

=== Junior level ===
Results in the 2019–20 season
Date	Event	SP		FS		Total	
Date	Event	P	Score	P	Score	P	Score
Jul 29 – Aug 3, 2019	(United States) 2019 Philadelphia Summer International	1	71.50	1	130.34	1	201.84
Aug 28–31, 2019	2019 JGP United States	3	71.34	3	130.38	4	201.72
Oct 2–5, 2019	2019 JGP Italy	4	72.19	7	131.28	7	203.47
Mar 2–8, 2020	(Estonia) 2020 World Junior Championships	13	74.02	18	121.95	16	195.97

Results in the 2021–22 season
Date	Event	SP		FS		Total	
Date	Event	P	Score	P	Score	P	Score
Aug 18–21, 2021	2021 JGP France I	1	80.07	1	134.57	1	214.64
Oct 6–9, 2021	2021 JGP Austria	1	81.31	1	164.04	1	245.35
Apr 13–17, 2022	(Estonia) 2022 World Junior Championships	1	88.99	1	187.12	1	276.11
