= Hope (NF album) =

Studio album by NF
- Released: April 7, 2023
- Genre: Hip-hop
- Length: 49:31
- Labels: NF Real Music II; Capitol; Caroline; Virgin
- Producers: David Garcia; Nathan Feuerstein; Saint X; Tommee Profitt; Jeff Sojka

NF chronology
Clouds (The Mixtape) (2021)	Hope (2023)	Fear (2025)

Singles from Hope
- 1. "Hope" Released: February 16, 2023; 2. "Motto" Released: March 9, 2023; 3. "Happy" Released: April 7, 2023

Hope (stylized in all-caps) is the fifth studio album by American rapper NF, released on April 7, 2023 through Capitol Music, Caroline Records, NF Real Music II, and Virgin Music. It was preceded by two singles: "Hope" and "Motto", with the third single "Happy" coinciding with the album. It features guest appearances from Cordae and Julia Michaels. NF later announced a 47-stop world tour on March 30, 2023, in support of the album, with the former as a special guest. It is his first studio album in four years since 2019's The Search, and his first project in two years since 2021's Clouds (The Mixtape).

== Promotion ==
The album was announced on February 16, 2023, along with the title track and second single, and released along with the music video of the track "Happy" on April 7, 2023.

== Critical reception ==
Professional ratings
Review scores
Source	Rating
AllMusic	3.5/5 stars
Clash	7/10

Critic Robin Murray of Clash wrote, "This is perhaps [NF's] most personal document yet, one that dares to deal with self-doubt and worthlessness in the public gaze. While some tracks hit harder than others, ... it's a worthy attempt to look beyond the darkness, and embrace the light."

Khushboo Rathore from The Diamondback wrote, "As a whole, the album feels a little disorganized, but it's a positive turn on NF's usual content. It feels good to see him growing and becoming happy, and it gives me hope for my own future."

An anonymous writer of Allmusic gave the album a 3.5 star rating, describing the album as "building upon the emotional struggles that informed 2016's Therapy Session and 2019's The Search with a sense that there is often a light at the end of a dark tunnel."

== Commercial performance ==
Hope debuted at number two on the US Billboard 200, selling 123,000 album-equivalent units, of which 80,500 were pure album sales. The album, which was blocked from the number one spot by country singer Morgan Wallen's One Thing at a Time, became NF's third top-ten album (and fourth top-ten project overall).

== Track listing ==
Hope track listing
No.	Title	Writer(s)	Producer(s)	Length
1.	"Hope"	Nathan Feuerstein; Tommee Profitt	Feuerstein; Profitt; Jeff Sojka^{[a]}	4:24
2.	"Motto"	Feuerstein; Profitt	Feuerstein; Profitt	3:37
3.	"Careful" (featuring Cordae)	Feuerstein; Cordae Dunston; David Garcia	Feuerstein; Garcia	3:29
4.	"Mama"	Feuerstein; Profitt; Cole Walowac	Feuerstein; Profitt; Saint X	3:28
5.	"Happy"	Feuerstein; Profitt	Feuerstein; Profitt; Sojka^{[a]}	4:02
6.	"Pandemonium"	Feuerstein; Profitt	Feuerstein; Profitt; Sojka^{[a]}	3:17
7.	"Suffice"	Feuerstein; Profitt; Walowac	Feuerstein; Profitt; Saint X	4:25
8.	"Gone" (featuring Julia Michaels)	Feuerstein; Julia Michaels; Profitt	Feuerstein; Profitt	4:06
9.	"Bullet"	Feuerstein; Profitt; Walowac	Feuerstein; Profitt; Saint X; Sojka^{[a]}	3:42
10.	"Turn My Back"	Feuerstein; Profitt; Walowac	Feuerstein; Profitt; Saint X	3:36
11.	"Mistake"	Feuerstein; Profitt	Feuerstein; Profitt	3:35
12.	"Let 'Em Pray"	Feuerstein; Profitt; Walowac	Feuerstein; Profitt; Saint X; Sojka^{[a]}	3:33
13.	"Running"	Feuerstein; Garcia	Feuerstein; Garcia	4:13
Total length:				49:31

Notes

- ^{^[a]} signifies an additional producer.
- All tracks are stylized in all caps, such as "Hope" being stylized as "HOPE".

== Personnel ==
- NF – vocals, production
- Alex Dobbert – mastering (1–4, 6, 7, 12)
- Mike Bozzi – mastering (5, 8–11, 13)
- Tommee Profitt – mixing (1, 2, 4–9, 11, 12), programming (1, 2, 4–9, 11, 12)
- Jeff Sojka – mixing (1–12), programming (1, 2, 5, 6, 8, 9, 12)
- David Garcia – mixing (10, 13), programming (3, 10, 13), engineering (10, 13), keyboards (10, 13), guitar (13)
- Cordae – vocals (3)
- Cole Walowac (Saint X) – programming (4, 7, 9, 10, 12), keyboards (10)
- Julia Michaels – vocals (8)

== Charts ==
=== Weekly charts ===
Weekly chart performance for Hope
Chart (2023)	Peak position
Australian Albums (ARIA)	2
Australian Hip Hop/R&B Albums (ARIA)	1
Austrian Albums (Ö3 Austria)	3
Belgian Albums (Ultratop Flanders)	3
Belgian Albums (Ultratop Wallonia)	29
Canadian Albums (Billboard)	2
Danish Albums (Hitlisten)	10
Dutch Albums (Album Top 100)	1
Finnish Albums (Suomen virallinen lista)	11
French Albums (SNEP)	136
German Albums (Offizielle Top 100)	6
Hungarian Albums (MAHASZ)	38
Irish Albums (Official Charts)	16
Lithuanian Albums (AGATA)	18
New Zealand Albums (RMNZ)	1
Norwegian Albums (VG-lista)	2
Polish Albums (ZPAV)	43
Scottish Albums (Official Charts)	4
Spanish Albums (Promusicae)	82
Swedish Albums (Sverigetopplistan)	15
Swiss Albums (Schweizer Hitparade)	1
UK Albums (Official Charts)	2
UK Christian & Gospel Albums (Official Charts)	1
UK R&B Albums (Official Charts)	1
US Billboard 200	2
US Top R&B/Hip-Hop Albums (Billboard)	1

=== Year-end charts ===
Year-end chart performance for Hope
Chart (2023)	Position
Belgian Albums (Ultratop Flanders)	78
US Billboard 200	162
US Top R&B/Hip-Hop Albums (Billboard)	60

== Certifications ==
Certifications for Hope
Region	Certification	Certified units/sales
New Zealand (RMNZ)	Gold	7,500^{‡}
United Kingdom (BPI)	Silver	60,000^{‡}
United States (RIAA)	Gold	500,000^{‡}
^{‡} Sales+streaming figures based on certification alone.
