= Motto (NF song) =

2023 single by NF

Single by NF

from the album Hope
- Released: March 9, 2023
- Genre: Hip hop
- Length: 3:37
- Label: NF Real Music; Caroline; Capitol
- Songwriters: Nate Feuerstein; Tommee Profitt
- Producers: NF; Profitt

NF singles chronology
"Hope" (2023)	"Motto" (2023)	"Happy" (2023)

Music video
- "Motto" on YouTube

"Motto" is a song by American rapper NF. Written and produced alongside Tommee Profitt, it was released on March 9, 2023, as the second single from his fifth studio album Hope.

== Composition and lyrics ==
In the lyrics, NF reflects on the choices he made in the course of his career, particularly his refusal to follow conventional ways to become a celebrity in music (such as rejecting the desires of his record label) and having been successful nevertheless from his own career path of focusing on authenticity rather than fame, while also poking fun at the music industry and Hollywood. Between rapping and singing, NF declares in the chorus, "You might see me in the same clothes I had on last week, am I ashamed? No. You heard the saying if it ain't broke, don't fix it that's my motto."

== Music video ==
The music video was directed by Patrick Tohill and NF and was released alongside the single. Shot in Nashville, Tennessee, it features the appearances of nearly a thousand fans of NF from around the world who volunteered as extras in the shoot. The video sees NF attending a mock industry awards show, sporting an all-beige tracksuit paired with a hat and shoes of the same color while everyone else is dressed formally. He causes trouble there, such as poking fun at others as he walks the red carpet, running in circles around other attendees, stealing the mic from a reporter, and standing in the way of the camera lens. Certain scenes recreate lyrics from the song, such as when NF props up his feet and chomps down popcorn in the middle of the room ("Might catch me at the award show / Eatin' popcorn in the back row"). At the end of the video, he is dragged out by security before noticing a man watching him while drinking from a cup (the same boy from NF's "When I Grow Up" video who had watched his concert while he was an underground artist), who gives him a brief wave.

== Charts ==
Chart performance for "Motto"
Chart (2023)	Peak position
Canada Hot 100 (Billboard)	83
Ireland (IRMA)	89
Netherlands (Single Tip)	21
New Zealand Hot Singles (RMNZ)	12
UK Singles (Official Charts)	73
US Bubbling Under Hot 100 (Billboard)	2
US Hot R&B/Hip-Hop Songs (Billboard)	29
