= Leave Me Alone (NF song) =

2019 song by NF

Song by NF

from the album The Search
- Released: July 26, 2019
- Genre: Hip hop
- Length: 5:08
- Label: NF Real Music; Caroline
- Songwriters: Nate Feuerstein; Tommee Profitt; Cole Walowac
- Producers: Feuerstein; Profitt; Walowac

Music video
- "Leave Me Alone" on YouTube

"Leave Me Alone" is a song by American rapper NF from his fourth studio album The Search (2019). It was written and produced alongside Tommee Profitt and Cole "Saint X" Walowac of Capital Kings.

== Content ==
The song revolves around mental health and the impact of fame; lyrically, NF details his feelings and the challenges regarding his sudden success in the music industry, accompanied with his self-hatred, as well as the consequences of his obsessive–compulsive disorder: "That means I might take a normal thought and think it's so profound (leave me alone) / Ruminating, fill balloons up full of doubt / Do the same things, if I don't, I'm overwhelmed / Thoughts are pacing, they go 'round and 'round and 'round".

== Charts ==
Chart (2019)	Peak position
Canada Hot 100 (Billboard)	68
Ireland (IRMA)	94
New Zealand Hot Singles (RMNZ)	12
US Billboard Hot 100	85
US Hot R&B/Hip-Hop Songs (Billboard)	33

== Certifications ==
Region	Certification	Certified units/sales
Australia (ARIA)	Gold	35,000^{‡}
Canada (Music Canada)	Platinum	80,000^{‡}
United States (RIAA)	Platinum	1,000,000^{‡}
^{‡} Sales+streaming figures based on certification alone.
