= Time (NF song) =

2019 song by NF

Single by NF

from the album The Search
- Released: July 12, 2019
- Genre: Hip hop; pop rap
- Length: 4:00 (album version); 3:50 (edit)
- Label: NF Real Music; Caroline
- Songwriters: Nate Feuerstein; Tommee Profitt
- Producers: Profitt; Feuerstein

NF singles chronology
"When I Grow Up" (2019)	"Time" (2019)	"Paid My Dues" (2019)

Music video
- "Time" on YouTube

"Time" is a song by American rapper NF, released on July 12, 2019, as the fourth single from his fourth studio album, The Search (2019). The song is NF's third highest-charting song on the Billboard Hot 100 to date, peaking at number 41.

== Composition ==
The song opens with a violin instrumental. NF reflects on his relationship with his wife, which is characterized by misunderstandings and tensions. Nevertheless, he is still deeply in love with her and is trying to hold on to the relationship. He explains that he is willing to change, but will need to take time.

== Charts ==
=== Weekly charts ===
Chart (2019)	Peak position
Australia (ARIA)	38
Canada Hot 100 (Billboard)	70
Ireland (IRMA)	66
Lithuania (AGATA)	37
New Zealand Hot Singles (RMNZ)	12
Romania (Airplay 100)	82
UK Singles (OCC)	76
US Billboard Hot 100	41
US Hot R&B/Hip-Hop Songs (Billboard)	19
US Pop Airplay (Billboard)	9
US Rhythmic Airplay (Billboard)	7
US Rolling Stone Top 100	34

=== Year-end charts ===
Chart (2019)	Position
US Hot R&B/Hip-Hop Songs (Billboard)	64
US Mainstream Top 40 (Billboard)	45
US Rhythmic (Billboard)	44

== Certifications ==
Region	Certification	Certified units/sales
Australia (ARIA)	3× Platinum	210,000^{‡}
Brazil (Pro-Música Brasil)	Gold	20,000^{‡}
Canada (Music Canada)	2× Platinum	160,000^{‡}
New Zealand (RMNZ)	Platinum	30,000^{‡}
United Kingdom (BPI)	Silver	200,000^{‡}
United States (RIAA)	2× Platinum	2,000,000^{‡}
^{‡} Sales+streaming figures based on certification alone.
