= Happy (NF song) =

2023 single by NF

Single by NF

from the album Hope
- Released: April 7, 2023
- Genre: Pop rap
- Length: 4:02
- Label: NF Real Music; Caroline; Capitol
- Songwriters: Nate Feuerstein; Tommee Profitt
- Producers: Profitt; NF; Jeff Sojka

NF singles chronology
"Motto" (2023)	"Happy" (2023)

Music video
- "Happy" on YouTube

"Happy" is a song by American rapper NF. It was released on April 7, 2023 as the third single from his fifth studio album Hope, which was released on the same day.

== Lyrics ==
The track sees NF exploring his own capability of being happy, mentioning childhood trauma, and his struggle with mental health. He examines reasons that could be behind his "agony" when he feels that he should be happy because of how he has been blessed.

== Music video ==
The video was directed by Patrick Tohill and NF. It begins with similar shots switching back and forth from the perspectives of a young girl and her older self, both feeling unloved and unwanted. It shows her parents arguing and the child being left alone and neglected by them. Towards the end of the video, the child is seen at her birthday party, clearly unhappy and depressed. As she looks around the room at her friends and their parents, she blows the candles out on her cake and wishes that her mother would have been there for her too. It then shows scenes that mirror earlier shots, except now instead of the girl being alone, her mother is present, culminating in the child smiling for the first time in the video. At the very end, the older character drives to their childhood home and visits her mother.

== Charts ==
Chart performance for "Happy"
Chart (2023)	Peak position
Austria (Ö3 Austria Top 40)	34
Canada Hot 100 (Billboard)	45
Canada CHR/Top 40 (Billboard)	31
Czech Republic Airplay (ČNS IFPI)	11
Germany (GfK)	89
Global 200 (Billboard)	88
Ireland (IRMA)	65
Netherlands (Single Top 100)	73
New Zealand Hot Singles (RMNZ)	4
Sweden Heatseeker (Sverigetopplistan)	19
Switzerland (Schweizer Hitparade)	60
UK Singles (Official Charts)	51
US Billboard Hot 100	54
US Adult Pop Airplay (Billboard)	30
US Pop Airplay (Billboard)	16

== Certifications ==
Certifications for "Happy"
Region	Certification	Certified units/sales
Australia (ARIA)	Gold	35,000^{‡}
New Zealand (RMNZ)	Gold	15,000^{‡}
United States (RIAA)	Gold	500,000^{‡}
^{‡} Sales+streaming figures based on certification alone.

== Release history ==
"Happy" release history
Region	Date	Format(s)	Label	Ref.
United States	April 7, 2023	Contemporary hit radio	NF Real; Virgin	
