= Hope (NF song) =

2023 single by NF

Single by NF

from the album Hope
- Released: February 16, 2023
- Genre: Hip hop
- Length: 4:24
- Label: NF Real Music; Caroline; Capitol
- Songwriters: Nate Feuerstein; Tommee Profitt
- Producers: Profitt; Feuerstein; Jeff Sojka

NF singles chronology
"Lost" (2021)	"Hope" (2023)	"Motto" (2023)

Music video
- "Hope" on YouTube

"Hope" is a song by American rapper NF, released on February 16, 2023, as the lead single from his fifth studio album of the same name. Written with Tommee Profitt, the two produced it with Jeff Sojka.

In 2025, the song became popular in the niche sport of the arts circuit Winter Guard International. With various groups ranging from A Class to World Class using the song as their soundtrack for the season.

== Composition ==
"Hope" is split into two parts. The song begins with "plucky" piano chords before segueing into staccato stringed instruments and a pulsing echo of voices in the background, and features tempo changes and crescendos. Lyrically, the song deals with NF overcoming his internal conflicts, as he raps about topics such as faith, fatherhood, pain and success, especially on trusting one's gut and being authentic while still holding onto the best qualities of oneself. In the second part, he reflects on his past self and focuses on being a voice of reason without giving up the qualities of who he once was.

== Critical reception ==
Wonderland gave a positive review of the song: "'Hope' is dramatic and cinematic, expertly crafted in its build up to a rousing climatic. NF brings the nuanced delivery and thoughtful lyricism that we have grown to love from him."

== Music video ==
The official music video, released on the same day as the song, was directed by NF and Patrick Tohill. It opens with NF stranded on a wooden raft in the middle of an ocean and in an all-white outfit, rapping as he finds his way to the shore. Later, a clone of himself clothed entirely in black misguides NF around the island before mocking him and pushing him through the roof of an abandoned mansion. Wandering through, NF confronts a different version of himself in every room he enters, each of them representing NF during a particular era of his musical career. He is eventually transported to a mountain top, looking lost as he raps.

== Charts ==
Chart performance for "Hope"
Chart (2023)	Peak position
Austria (Ö3 Austria Top 40)	42
Canada Hot 100 (Billboard)	40
Czech Republic Singles Digital (ČNS IFPI)	82
Germany (GfK)	73
Global 200 (Billboard)	64
Ireland (IRMA)	49
Netherlands (Single Top 100)	61
New Zealand Hot Singles (RMNZ)	7
Slovakia Singles Digital (ČNS IFPI)	89
Switzerland (Schweizer Hitparade)	54
UK Singles (OCC)	48
US Billboard Hot 100	49
US Hot R&B/Hip-Hop Songs (Billboard)	16

== Certifications ==
Certifications for "Hope"
Region	Certification	Certified units/sales
Australia (ARIA)	Gold	35,000^{‡}
Canada (Music Canada)	Gold	40,000^{‡}
United States (RIAA)	Gold	500,000^{‡}
^{‡} Sales+streaming figures based on certification alone.
