= The Search (NF album) =

Studio album by NF
- Released: July 26, 2019
- Genre: Hip-hop
- Length: 72:12
- Label: NF Real Music; Caroline

NF chronology
Perception (2017)	The Search (2019)	Clouds (The Mixtape) (2021)

Singles from The Search
- 1. "Why" Released: June 18, 2018; 2. "The Search" Released: May 30, 2019; 3. "When I Grow Up" Released: June 27, 2019; 4. "Time" Released: July 12, 2019

The Search is the fourth studio album by American rapper NF. It was released on July 26, 2019, through NF Real Music and Caroline, and was preceded by the singles "Why", "The Search", "When I Grow Up" and "Time". It features a sole collaboration with Sasha Sloan. NF embarked on a North American tour in September and October 2019 in support of the album. Despite receiving mixed reviews from music critics, the album debuted atop the Billboard 200, becoming NF's second US No. 1 album. It serves as a follow-up to his 2017 album Perception (2017).

== Promotion ==
The album was announced along with the second single and title track, which "express[es] the hard quest [NF has] been on lately in his life with the help of rapid fire rap verses".

== Critical reception ==
Professional ratings
Aggregate scores
Source	Rating
Metacritic	58/100
Review scores
Source	Rating
AllMusic	3.5/5 stars
HipHopDX	4.0/5
Pitchfork	4.0/10
RapReviews	8/10
Rolling Stone	2/5 stars

At Metacritic, which assigns a normalized rating out of 100 to reviews from mainstream critics, the album has an average score of 58 based on 6 reviews, indicating "mixed or average reviews". Writing for Pitchfork, Evan Rytlewski described the album as inducing a feeling of powerlessness and questioned how listeners "are supposed to respond to an album that often reads like a suicide note". Rytlewski wrote that NF "spends much of The Search darting in and out of an overbearing rappity-rap snarl-yell" and called his "struggles with mental illness [...] life-threatening", concluding that the album is an "unpleasant ride". Jon Caramanica was more sympathetic in his assessment for The New York Times, considering NF an "objectively strong rapper". However, he described the record as "alternately thrilling and draining" as well as "sometimes vigorous, sometimes exhausting", likening the listening experience to "living inside a snare drum during a marching band's halftime performance", and was critical of the lack of musical and lyrical variation on it. Chris DeVille of Stereogum wrote that while "the album's gothic heaviness sometimes suffocates its considerable pop acumen", its theme of struggle against mental health makes it "easy to see why legions of hurting kids gravitate to this music, especially those who reject the nihilism and hopelessness that defines many similar alternatives".

== Commercial performance ==
The Search was initially predicted to debut at No. 2 on the US Billboard 200 with 95,000 album-equivalent units, 15,000 units behind Chance the Rapper's debut studio album The Big Day. The Search instead debuted at No. 1 with a larger-than-expected 130,000 units, 22,000 more than Chance the Rapper's album despite its extensive promotion and advantage in the area of streaming. 84,000 of these came from album sales. Its commercial success was aided by strong sales through the iTunes Store, merchandise and bundles through the rapper's web store as well as concert ticket/album sale redemption offers.

== Track listing ==
The digital edition of the album features an edit of "Time" as the 20th track. Credits adapted from Tidal.

No.	Title	Writer(s)	Producer(s)	Length
1.	"The Search"	Nate Feuerstein; Thomas "Tommee" Profitt	Feuerstein; Profitt	4:08
2.	"Leave Me Alone"	Feuerstein; Profitt; Cole Walowac	Feuerstein; Profitt; Walowac	5:08
3.	"Change"	Feuerstein; Profitt	Feuerstein; Profitt	3:54
4.	"My Stress"	Feuerstein; Profitt	Feuerstein; Profitt	4:12
5.	"Nate"	Feuerstein; Profitt	Feuerstein; Profitt	5:02
6.	"Time"	Feuerstein; Profitt	Feuerstein; Profitt	4:00
7.	"Returns"	Feuerstein; Profitt; Walowac	Feuerstein; Profitt; Walowac	3:52
8.	"When I Grow Up"	Feuerstein; Profitt	Feuerstein; Profitt	3:16
9.	"Only" (with Sasha Sloan)	Feuerstein; Profitt; Sasha Sloan; Henry Allen	Feuerstein; Profitt	3:45
10.	"Let Me Go"	Feuerstein; Profitt; Walowac	Feuerstein; Profitt; Walowac	4:37
11.	"-Interlude-"	Feuerstein; Profitt	Feuerstein; Profitt	0:49
12.	"Hate Myself"	Feuerstein; Profitt	Feuerstein; Profitt	4:20
13.	"I Miss the Days"	Feuerstein; Profitt	Feuerstein; Profitt	4:29
14.	"No Excuses"	Feuerstein; Profitt; Walowac	Feuerstein; Profitt; Walowac	3:21
15.	"Like This"	Feuerstein; David Arthur Garcia; Walowac	Feuerstein; David Garcia; Walowac	3:27
16.	"Options"	Feuerstein; Garcia; Cameron Doyle	Feuerstein; Garcia; Cameron Doyle	3:26
17.	"Why"	Feuerstein; Profitt; Walowac	Feuerstein; Profitt; Walowac	3:08
18.	"Thinking"	Feuerstein; Walowac	Feuerstein; Walowac	3:12
19.	"Trauma"	Feuerstein; Profitt	Feuerstein; Profitt	4:07
Total length:				72:12

Digital bonus track
No.	Title	Writer(s)	Length
20.	"Time" (edit)	Feuerstein; Profitt	3:50
Total length:			76:02

== Charts ==
=== Weekly charts ===
Chart (2019)	Peak position
Australian Albums (ARIA)	3
Austrian Albums (Ö3 Austria)	15
Belgian Albums (Ultratop Flanders)	10
Belgian Albums (Ultratop Wallonia)	158
Canadian Albums (Billboard)	4
Czech Albums (ČNS IFPI)	25
Danish Albums (Hitlisten)	10
Dutch Albums (Album Top 100)	6
Finnish Albums (Suomen virallinen lista)	14
French Albums (SNEP)	158
German Albums (Offizielle Top 100)	26
Irish Albums (IRMA)	8
Latvian Albums (LAIPA)	5
Lithuanian Albums (AGATA)	3
New Zealand Albums (RMNZ)	3
Norwegian Albums (VG-lista)	11
Scottish Albums (OCC)	33
Swedish Albums (Sverigetopplistan)	35
Swiss Albums (Schweizer Hitparade)	9
UK Albums (OCC)	7
UK Christian & Gospel Albums (OCC)	1
UK R&B Albums (OCC)	1
US Billboard 200	1
US Independent Albums (Billboard)	1
US Top R&B/Hip-Hop Albums (Billboard)	1

=== Year-end charts ===
Chart (2019)	Position
Belgian Albums (Ultratop Flanders)	179
Dutch Albums (Album Top 100)	67
US Billboard 200	95
US Top R&B/Hip-Hop Albums (Billboard)	38
Chart (2020)	Position
Australian Albums (ARIA)	85
Belgian Albums (Ultratop Flanders)	83
Dutch Albums (Album Top 100)	71
US Billboard 200	75
US Top R&B/Hip-Hop Albums (Billboard)	60
Chart (2021)	Position
Belgian Albums (Ultratop Flanders)	135
US Billboard 200	142
Chart (2022)	Position
Belgian Albums (Ultratop Flanders)	171
Chart (2023)	Position
Belgian Albums (Ultratop Flanders)	158

== Certifications ==
Region	Certification	Certified units/sales
Australia (ARIA)	Gold	35,000^{‡}
Canada (Music Canada)	Platinum	80,000^{‡}
Denmark (IFPI Danmark)	Platinum	20,000^{‡}
New Zealand (RMNZ)	Platinum	15,000^{‡}
Poland (ZPAV)	Gold	10,000^{‡}
Sweden (GLF)	Gold	15,000^{‡}
United Kingdom (BPI)	Platinum	300,000^{‡}
United States (RIAA)	Platinum	1,000,000^{‡}
^{‡} Sales+streaming figures based on certification alone.
