= The Search (song) =

Single by NF

from the album The Search
- Released: May 30, 2019
- Genre: Hip hop
- Length: 4:08 (album version); 3:17 (edit)
- Label: Capitol
- Songwriters: Nate Feuerstein; Tommee Profitt
- Producers: Feuerstein; Profitt

NF singles chronology
"If You Want Love" (2019)	"The Search" (2019)	"When I Grow Up" (2019)

Music video
- "The Search" on YouTube

"The Search" is a song by American rapper NF, released through Capitol Records on May 30, 2019, as the second single from the album of the same name. It was written and produced by NF alongside Tommee Profitt, and lyrically discusses the negative impact of fame and commercial success on NF's mental and physical health. A music video was released the same day as the song. It debuted at number 70 on the US Billboard Hot 100.

== Composition and lyrics ==
"The Search" lasts for a duration of 4 minutes and 8 seconds, with NF rapping 777 words throughout the track. The song's production features "prickly strings, choral backing chants and an unforgiving beat drop" and its structure contains a 30 second intro and lacks a chorus. Lyrically, it discusses the impact on NF's mental health as a consequence of his mainstream success. While the rapper initially understates the negative impact of fame on his life, he soon escalates his criticisms of commercial accomplishments, stating that "The sales can rise/ Doesn't mean much though when your health declines."

== Meaning ==
The main message in this song is one of doing well. He starts off his song by “honestly answering the casual and frequent question, “How’s life?” NF continues to answer the greeting throughout the track by discussing recent changes in life, depression and the world itself.”

== Critical reception ==
Danielle Chelosky of Substream Magazine described "The Search" as "introspective and unapologetic," while Tyler Schmitt of Variance Magazine called it "blistering." Jon Caramanica, writing for The New York Times, commended NF's delivery, writing that he "raps tartly and with compelling angst." Andrew Unterberger of Billboard wrote that the track "proves that fame is one long anxiety attack" and added that its production gives "the meltdown overtaking his mind operatic grandeur.".

== Appearances in media ==
The song is featured in the trailer of season three of the video game Apex Legends. From October 19, 2020 to February 2022, the song was featured as the opening theme song for WWE's Monday Night Raw.. The song also appeared in Fortnite in the Fortnite Festival mode and as a "Jam Track" emote for "Battle Royale" mode.

== Personnel ==
Credits adapted from Tidal.

- Nate Feuerstein – composer, lyricist, producer
- Tommee Profitt – composer, lyricist, producer, mastering engineer, mixer, studio personnel

== Charts ==
Chart (2019)	Peak position
Canada (Canadian Hot 100)	59
Ireland (IRMA)	69
New Zealand Hot Singles (RMNZ)	12
UK Singles (OCC)	88
US Billboard Hot 100	70
US Hot R&B/Hip-Hop Songs (Billboard)	27

== Certifications ==
Region	Certification	Certified units/sales
Australia (ARIA)	3× Platinum	210,000^{‡}
Brazil (Pro-Música Brasil)	Platinum	40,000^{‡}
Canada (Music Canada)	3× Platinum	240,000^{‡}
Denmark (IFPI Danmark)	Gold	45,000^{‡}
France (SNEP)	Gold	100,000^{‡}
Italy (FIMI)	Gold	50,000^{‡}
New Zealand (RMNZ)	Platinum	30,000^{‡}
Poland (ZPAV)	Platinum	50,000^{‡}
United Kingdom (BPI)	Platinum	600,000^{‡}
United States (RIAA)	2× Platinum	2,000,000^{‡}
^{‡} Sales+streaming figures based on certification alone.
