= When I Grow Up (NF song) =

2019 single by NF

Single by NF

from the album The Search
- Released: June 27, 2019
- Genre: Hip hop
- Length: 3:16
- Label: NF Real Music; Caroline
- Songwriter(s): Nate Feuerstein; Tommee Profitt
- Producer(s): Feuerstein; Profitt

NF singles chronology
"The Search" (2019)	"When I Grow Up" (2019)	"Time" (2019)

Music video
- "When I Grow Up" on YouTube

"When I Grow Up" is a song by American rapper NF, released on June 27, 2019 as the third single from his fourth studio album The Search. Written and produced by NF and Tommee Profitt, it peaked at number 78 on the Billboard Hot 100.

== Composition ==
On the track, NF narrates from his perspective when he was a child. He recounts his childhood dream of becoming a professional rapper, and his strong determination to pursue his career despite the extreme difficulty to do so and how the events in his life turn out.

== Music video ==
The music video was directed by NF and Patrick Tohill. It begins with several kids, including a young NF, saying what they want to be when they grow up. NF says that he is going to be a rapper. The scene then shifts to his back-to-back jobs working as a garbage disposal man, a janitor, and working at a fast food restaurant, until finally he follows his dream.

== Charts ==
Chart performance for "When I Grow Up"
Chart (2019)	Peak position
Canada (Canadian Hot 100)	55
Ireland (IRMA)	63
New Zealand Hot Singles (RMNZ)	10
UK Singles (OCC)	98
US Billboard Hot 100	78
US Hot R&B/Hip-Hop Songs (Billboard)	28
US Rolling Stone Top 100	88

== Certifications ==
Certifications for "When I Grow Up"
Region	Certification	Certified units/sales
Australia (ARIA)	Platinum	70,000^{‡}
Canada (Music Canada)	Platinum	80,000^{‡}
New Zealand (RMNZ)	Gold	15,000^{‡}
Poland (ZPAV)	Gold	25,000^{‡}
United Kingdom (BPI)	Silver	200,000^{‡}
United States (RIAA)	2× Platinum	2,000,000^{‡}
^{‡} Sales+streaming figures based on certification alone.
