= 2024 European Athletics Championships – Women's pole vault =

Women's pole vault at the 2024 European Athletics Championships
- Venue: Stadio Olimpico
- Location: Rome
- Dates: 8 June (qualification); 10 June (final)
- Competitors: 30 from 15 nations
- Winning mark: 4.78 m

Medalists
gold medal	Angelica Moser	Switzerland
silver medal	Aikaterini Stefanidi	Greece
bronze medal	Molly Caudery	Great Britain

The women's pole vault at the 2024 European Athletics Championships took place at the Stadio Olimpico on 8 and 10 June.

== Records ==
Standing records prior to the 2024 European Athletics Championships
World record	Yelena Isinbayeva (RUS)	5.06 m	Zürich, Switzerland	28 August 2009
European record	Yelena Isinbayeva (RUS)	5.06 m	Zürich, Switzerland	28 August 2009
Championship record	Katerina Stefanidi (GRE)	4.85 m	Berlin, Germany	9 August 2018
Championship record	Wilma Murto (FIN)	4.85 m	Munich, Germany	17 August 2022
World Leading	Molly Caudery (GBR)	4.86 m	Rouen, France	24 February 2024
Europe Leading	Molly Caudery (GBR)	4.86 m	Rouen, France	24 February 2024

== Schedule ==
Date	Time	Round
8 June 2024	10:40	Qualification
10 June 2024	20:15	Final

All times are local times (UTC+2)

== Results ==
=== Qualification ===
Qualification: 4.55 m (Q) or best 12 performances (q).

Rank	Group	Name	Nationality	4.10	4.25	4.40	4.50	4.55	Result	Notes
1	B	Anjuli Knäsche	Germany	o	o	o	o		4.50	q
1	B	Elisa Molinarolo	Italy	–	o	o	o		4.50	q
1	B	Amálie Švábíková	Czech Republic	–	–	o	o		4.50	q
1	B	Wilma Murto	Finland	–	–	o	o		4.50	q
1	A	Molly Caudery	Great Britain	–	–	–	o		4.50	q
6	A	Angelica Moser	Switzerland	–	–	o	xo		4.50	q
6	A	Aikaterini Stefanidi	Greece	–	–	–	xo		4.50	q
6	A	Elina Lampela	Finland	o	o	o	xo		4.50	q
6	A	Roberta Bruni	Italy	–	o	o	xo		4.50	q
6	B	Pascale Stöcklin	Switzerland	–	o	o	xo		4.50	q
11	B	Ninon Chapelle	France	–	o	xo	xo		4.50	q
11	A	Alix Dehaynain	France	–	xo	o	xo		4.50	q
13	A	Sonia Malavisi	Italy	o	o	o	xxx		4.40	
13	A	Kitty Friele Faye	Norway	–	o	o	xxx		4.40	
13	A	Nikola Pöschlová	Czech Republic	o	o	o	xxx		4.40	
16	A	Eleni-Klaoudia Polak	Greece	–	xo	o	xxx		4.40	
16	B	Marleen Mülla	Estonia	o	xo	o	xxx		4.40	
18	A	Jacqueline Otchere	Germany	xo	xo	o	xxx		4.40	
19	A	Lea Bachmann	Switzerland	xo	xo	xo	xxx		4.40	
20	B	Ariadni Adamopoulou	Greece	o	o	xxo	xxx		4.40	
20	A	Marie-Julie Bonnin	France	–	o	xxo	xxx		4.40	
22	A	Hanga Klekner	Hungary	–	xo	xxx			4.25	
23	B	Caroline Bonde Holm	Denmark	o	xxo	xxx			4.25	
24	A	Saga Andersson	Finland	o	xxx				4.10	
24	B	Yana Hladiychuk	Ukraine	o	xxx				4.10	
	B	Elien Vekemans	Belgium	xxx					NM	
	B	Silja Andersson	Finland	xxx					NM	
	B	Holly Bradshaw	Great Britain	–	xxx				NM	
	B	Lene Onsrud Retzius	Norway	–	xxx				NM	
	B	Tina Šutej	Slovenia	r					NM	

=== Final ===
Rank	Name	Nationality	4.28	4.43	4.58	4.68	4.73	4.78	4.83	Result	Notes
1st place, gold medalist(s)	Angelica Moser	Switzerland	–	xxo	o	xo	x-	o	xxx	4.78	=NR
2nd place, silver medalist(s)	Katerina Stefanidi	Greece	–	o	o	o	o	x-	xx	4.73	SB
3rd place, bronze medalist(s)	Molly Caudery	Great Britain	–	–	o	xo	xo	x-	xx	4.73	
4	Amálie Švábíková	Czech Republic	–	o	o	xxx				4.58	
4	Elina Lampela	Finland	o	o	o	xxx				4.58	
6	Elisa Molinarolo	Italy	o	o	xo	xx-	x			4.58	
7	Roberta Bruni	Italy	xo	o	xxo	xxx				4.58	
8	Wilma Murto	Finland	–	o	xxx					4.43	
9	Ninon Chapelle	France	o	xo	xxx					4.43	
9	Alix Dehaynain	France	o	xo	xxx					4.43	
11	Anjuli Knäsche	Germany	xo	xo	xxx					4.43	
12	Pascale Stöcklin	Switzerland	o	xxx						4.28	
