= 2021 European Athletics U23 Championships – Women's pole vault =

Women's pole vault at the 2021 European Athletics U23 Championships
- Venue: Kadriorg Stadium, Tallinn
- Dates: 9 and 11 July
- Competitors: 24 from 16 nations
- Winning mark: 4.50

Medalists
gold medal	Amálie Švábíková	Czech Republic
silver medal	Molly Caudery	Great Britain
bronze medal	Lisa Gunnarsson	Sweden

The women's pole vault event at the 2021 European Athletics U23 Championships was held in Tallinn, Estonia, at Kadriorg Stadium on 9 and 11 July.

== Records ==
Prior to the competition, the records were as follows:

European U23 record	Yelena Isinbayeva (RUS)	4.92	Brussels, Belgium	3 September 2004
Championship U23 record	Angelina Zhuk-Krasnova (RUS)	4.70	Tampere, Finland	13 July 2013

== Results ==
=== Qualification ===
Qualification rule: 4.40 (Q) or the 12 best results (q) qualified for the final.

Rank	Group	Name	Nationality	3.75	3.90	4.05	4.20	Results	Notes
1	A	Molly Caudery	Great Britain	–	–	o	o	4.20	q
1	B	Margot Chevrier	France	–	–	–	o	4.20	q
1	A	Lisa Gunnarsson	Sweden	–	–	o	o	4.20	q
1	A	Linnea Jönsson	Sweden	o	o	o	o	4.20	q
1	B	Amálie Švábíková	Czech Republic	–	–	o	o	4.20	q
1	A	Leni Freyja Wildgrube	Germany	–	–	o	o	4.20	q
7	A	Ariadni Adamopoulou	Greece	–	o	xo	o	4.20	q
7	B	Andrina Hodel	Switzerland	–	-	xo	o	4.20	q
9	A	Maria Roberta Gherca	Italy	xo	o	xo	o	4.20	q, =PB
10	A	Elina Giallurachis	France	-	-	-	xo	4.20	q
11	B	Saga Andersson	Finland	-	-	xo	xo	4.20	q
12	B	Hanga Klekner	Hungary	-	o	xxo	xo	4.20	q
13	A	Marleen Mülla	Estonia	–	o	o	xxx	4.05	
14	B	Ellen McCartney	Ireland	o	xo	o	xxx	4.05	
15	A	Tereza Schejbalová	Czech Republic	o	xxo	o	xxx	4.05	
16	B	Gabriella Jönsson	Sweden	o	o	xo	xxx	4.05	
17	A	Krystsina Kantsavenka	Belarus	–	xo	xo	xxx	4.05	
18	B	Nathalie Kofler	Italy	xo	xo	xo	xxx	4.05	
19	B	Anne Berger	Germany	o	o	xxo	xxx	4.05	
20	B	Francesca Zafrani	Italy	–	o	xxx		3.90	
21	B	Mesure Tutku Yılmaz	Turkey	o	xxx			3.75	
	B	Ella Buchner	Germany	–	xxx			NM	
	A	Nastja Modic	Slovenia	xxx				NM	
	A	Mariya Yashchenko	Ukraine	xxx				NM	

=== Final ===
Rank	Name	Nationality	4.00	4.15	4.25	4.35	4.40	4.45	4.50	4.55	4.60	Result	Notes
1st place, gold medalist(s)	Amálie Švábíková	Czech Republic	–	o	–	xo	o	xo	o	xx–	x	4.50	SB
2nd place, silver medalist(s)	Molly Caudery	Great Britain	–	o	o	o	xo	o	x–	xx		4.45	=SB
3rd place, bronze medalist(s)	Lisa Gunnarsson	Sweden	–	o	xo	o	xo	x–	xx			4.40	
4	Margot Chevrier	France	–	–	o	xxo	xx–	x				4.35	
5	Hanga Klekner	Hungary	xo	xxo	o	xxx						4.25	=SB
6	Saga Andersson	Finland	o	xxo	xo	xxx						4.25	
7	Elina Giallurachis	France	–	–	xxo	xxx						4.25	
8	Andrina Hodel	Switzerland	–	xo	xxx							4.15	
8	Leni Freyja Wildgrube	Germany	–	xo	xxx							4.15	
10	Linnea Jönsson	Sweden	o	xxx								4.00	
11	Ariadni Adamopoulou	Greece	xo	xxx								4.00	
	Maria Roberta Gherca	Italy	xxx									NM	
