= 2018 IAAF World U20 Championships – Women's pole vault =

Women's pole vault at the 2018 World U20 Championships
- Venue: Ratina Stadium
- Dates: 10 July (qualification); 12 July (final)
- Competitors: 28 from 18 nations
- Winning height: 4.51 m

Medalists
gold medal	Amálie Švábíková	Czech Republic
silver medal	Lisa Gunnarsson	Sweden
bronze medal	Alice Moindrot	France

The women's pole vault at the 2018 IAAF World U20 Championships was held at Ratina Stadium on 10 and 12 July.

== Records ==
Standing records prior to the 2018 IAAF World U20 Championships in Athletics
World U20 Record	Wilma Murto (FIN)	4.71	Zweibrücken, Germany	31 January 2016
Championship Record	Angelica Moser (SUI)	4.55	Bydgoszcz, Poland	21 July 2016
World U20 Leading	Lisa Gunnarsson (SWE)	4.60	Austin, United States	31 March 2018

== Results ==
=== Qualification ===
The qualification round took place on 10 July, in two groups, both starting at 16:23. Athletes attaining a mark of at least 4.25 metres ( Q ) or at least the 12 best performers ( q ) qualified for the final.

Rank	Group	Name	Nationality	3.65	3.80	3.95	4.10	4.20	Mark	Notes
1	A	Alice Moindrot	France	–	–	o	o	o	4.20	q
1	B	Amálie Švábíková	Czech Republic	–	–	o	o	o	4.20	q
1	A	Saga Andersson	Finland	–	–	o	o	o	4.20	q
1	B	Yelizaveta Bondarenko	Authorised Neutral Athletes	–	–	–	o	o	4.20	q
1	B	Wu Zuocheng	China	–	–	o	o	o	4.20	q, SB
6	A	Niu Chunge	China	–	–	xo	o	o	4.20	q, PB
7	A	Lisa Gunnarsson	Sweden	–	–	–	o	xo	4.20	q
8	B	Molly Caudery	Great Britain	–	–	o	xo	xo	4.20	q
9	B	Olivia McTaggart	New Zealand	–	o	xxo	o	xo	4.20	q
10	A	Rachel Baxter	United States	–	–	xo	xxo	xo	4.20	q
11	B	Julia Fixsen	United States	–	–	xo	o	xxx	4.10	q
11	B	Meritxell Benito	Spain	xo	o	o	o	xxx	4.10	q
13	A	Mesure Tutku Yılmaz	Turkey	–	xxo	o	o	xxx	4.10	
13	A	Zoe Jakob	Germany	o	xo	xo	o	xxx	4.10	PB
15	A	Nastja Modic	Slovenia	o	o	o	xo	xxx	4.10	PB
16	B	Dovilè Michelle Scheutzow	Germany	o	o	o	xxx		3.95	
17	A	Alicia Raso	Spain	xo	o	o	xxx		3.95	
17	B	Ariadni Adamopoulou	Greece	–	xo	o	xxx		3.95	
19	A	Imogen Ayris	New Zealand	–	xxo	o	xxx		3.95	
20	B	Carmen Villanueva	Venezuela	o	o	xo	xxx		3.95	
21	B	Maria Roberta Gherca	Italy	o	xo	xo	xxx		3.95	
21	A	Rebecca De Martin	Italy	o	xo	xo	xxx		3.95	
23	B	Isabel Demarco	Brazil	–	o	xxo	xxx		3.95	
24	A	Hanga Klekner	Hungary	o	o	xxx			3.80	
24	B	Anna Airault	France	–	o	xxx			3.80	
26	B	Linnea Jönsson	Sweden	o	xo	xxx			3.80	
27	A	Lauren Hyde-Cooling	Australia	o	xxx				3.65	
	A	Aksana Gataullina	Authorised Neutral Athletes	–	–	–	xxx		NH	

=== Final ===
The final was held on 12 July at 18:20.

Rank	Name	Nationality	3.85	4.00	4.10	4.20	4.25	4.30	4.35	4.40	4.51	4.60	Mark	Notes
1st place, gold medalist(s)	Amálie Švábíková	Czech Republic	–	–	xo	o	–	o	o	o	xxo	xr	4.51	NU20R
2nd place, silver medalist(s)	Lisa Gunnarsson	Sweden	–	–	o	xo	o	xo	xo	xxx			4.35	
3rd place, bronze medalist(s)	Alice Moindrot	France	–	–	o	–	xxo	–	xxo	xxx			4.35	
4	Yelizaveta Bondarenko	Authorised Neutral Athletes	–	–	o	xxo	–	xxo	xxo	xxx			4.35	
5	Olivia McTaggart	New Zealand	–	o	xo	xo	–	xo	xxx				4.30	
6	Niu Chunge	China	–	o	xo	o	o	xxx					4.25	PB
7	Saga Andersson	Finland	–	o	o	xo	xxx						4.20	
7	Julia Fixsen	United States	o	o	o	xo	xxx						4.20	
9	Molly Caudery	Great Britain	–	–	o	xxx							4.10	
9	Wu Zuocheng	China	–	o	o	xxx							4.10	
11	Rachel Baxter	United States	–	o	xxx								4.00	
12	Meritxell Benito	Spain	xxo	o	xxx								4.00	
