= 2022 European Athletics Championships – Women's pole vault =

Women's pole vault at the 2022 European Athletics Championships
- Venue: Olympiastadion
- Location: Munich
- Dates: 15 August (qualification); 17 August (final)
- Competitors: 25 from 15 nations
- Winning height: 4.85

Medalists
| gold medal | Wilma Murto | Finland |
| silver medal | Katerina Stefanidi | Greece |
| bronze medal | Tina Šutej | Slovenia |

The women's pole vault at the 2022 European Athletics Championships took place at the Olympiastadion on 15 and 17 August.

== Records ==
Standing records prior to the 2022 European Athletics Championships
| World record | Yelena Isinbayeva (RUS) | 5.06 m | Zürich, Switzerland | 28 August 2009 |
| European record | Yelena Isinbayeva (RUS) | 5.06 m | Zürich, Switzerland | 28 August 2009 |
| Championship record | Katerina Stefanidi (GRE) | 4.85 m | Berlin, Germany | 9 August 2018 |
| World Leading | Anzhelika Sidorova (ANA) | 4.91 m | Cheboksary, Russia | 2 August 2022 |
| Europe Leading | Anzhelika Sidorova (ANA) | 4.91 m | Cheboksary, Russia | 2 August 2022 |

== Schedule ==
| Date | Time | Round |
|---|---|---|
| 15 August 2022 | 10:25 | Qualification |
| 17 August 2022 | 20:00 | Final |

All times are local times (UTC+2)

== Results ==
=== Qualification ===
Qualification: 4.55 m (Q) or best 12 performances (q)

| Rank | Group | Name | Nationality | 4.10 | 4.25 | 4.40 | 4.50 | 4.55 | Result | Notes |
|---|---|---|---|---|---|---|---|---|---|---|
| 1 | B | Tina Šutej | Slovenia | – | – | o | o | | 4.50 | q |
| 2 | A | Lene Retzius | Norway | – | – | xxo | o | | 4.50 | q |
| 2 | A | Katerina Stefanidi | Greece | – | – | xxo | o | | 4.50 | q |
| 4 | B | Caroline Bonde Holm | Denmark | o | o | o | xo | | 4.50 | q |
| 4 | B | Angelica Moser | Switzerland | – | – | o | xo | | 4.50 | q |
| 6 | B | Roberta Bruni | Italy | – | xxo | o | xo | | 4.50 | q |
| 7 | A | Wilma Murto | Finland | – | o | o | xxo | | 4.50 | q |
| 8 | A | Molly Caudery | Great Britain | o | xo | o | xxo | | 4.50 | q |
| 9 | B | Sophie Cook | Great Britain | o | xo | xo | xxo | | 4.50 | q, =PB |
| 10 | B | Marie-Julie Bonnin | France | – | o | o | xxx | | 4.40 | q |
| 10 | B | Margot Chevrier | France | – | o | o | xxx | | 4.40 | q |
| 12 | B | Elina Lampela | Finland | o | xo | o | xxx | | 4.40 | q |
| 13 | A | Saga Andersson | Finland | xo | xxo | o | xxx | | 4.40 | |
| 14 | A | Ninon Chapelle | France | – | o | xo | xxx | | 4.40 | |
| 14 | B | Anjuli Knäsche | Germany | o | o | xo | xxx | | 4.40 | |
| 14 | A | Amálie Švábíková | Czech Republic | – | o | xo | xxx | | 4.40 | |
| 17 | B | Eleni-Klaoudia Polak | Greece | – | xxo | xxo | xxx | | 4.40 | |
| 18 | A | Yana Hladiychuk | Ukraine | – | o | xxx | | | 4.25 | |
| 18 | A | Hanga Klekner | Hungary | o | o | xxx | | | 4.25 | |
| 18 | A | Elisa Molinarolo | Italy | o | o | xxx | | | 4.25 | |
| 21 | A | Pascale Stöcklin | Switzerland | xo | o | xxx | | | 4.25 | |
| 22 | B | Maryna Kylypko | Ukraine | – | xo | xxx | | | 4.25 | |
| 23 | A | Jacqueline Otchere | Germany | o | xxx | | | | 4.10 | |
| 24 | B | Lisa Gunnarsson | Sweden | xxo | xxx | | | | 4.10 | |
| | A | Buse Arıkazan | Turkey | xxx | | | | | NM | |

=== Final ===
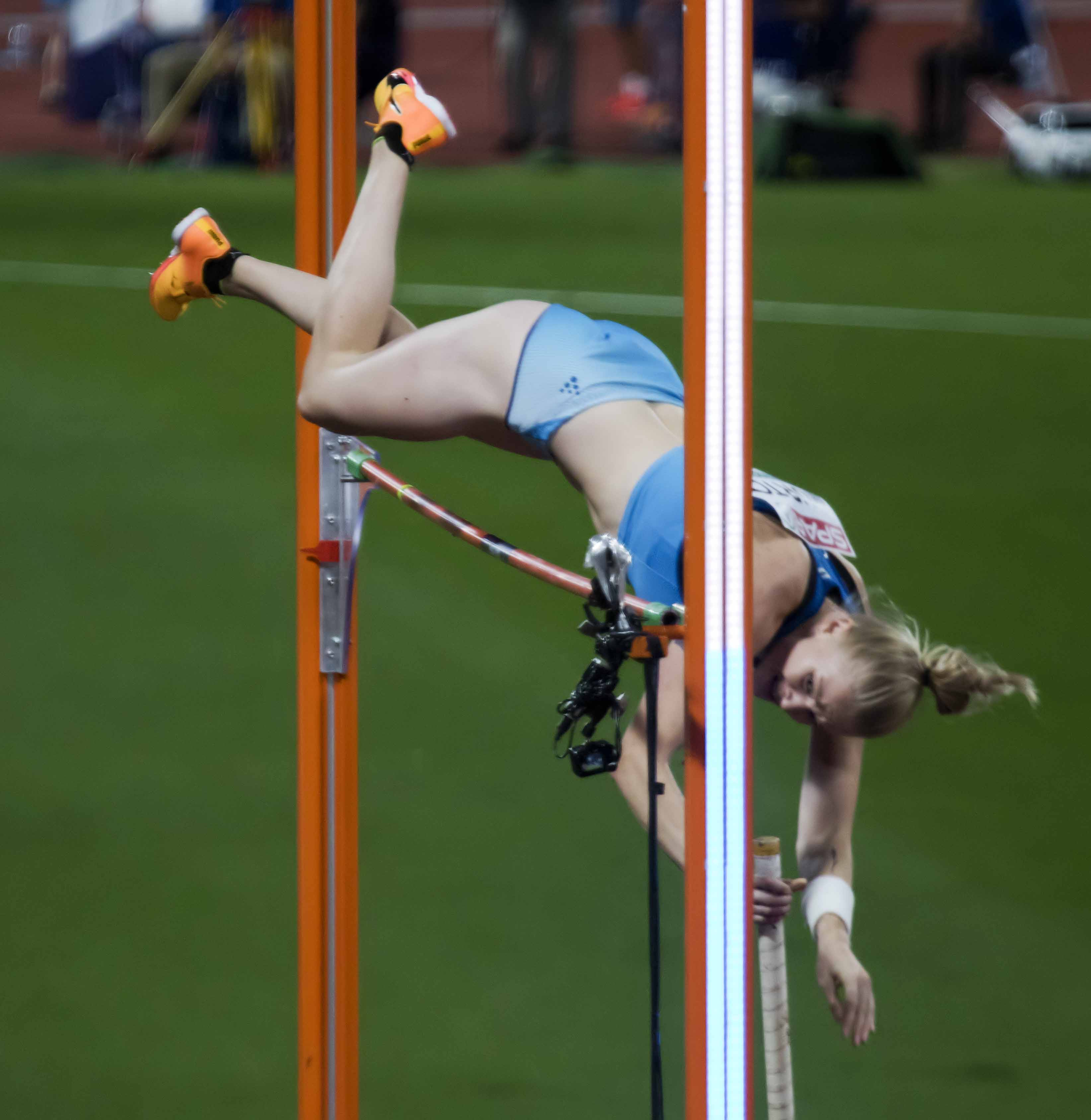
Wilma Murto in the final

| Rank | Name | Nationality | 4.25 | 4.40 | 4.55 | 4.65 | 4.70 | 4.75 | 4.80 | 4.85 | 4.90 | Result | Notes |
|---|---|---|---|---|---|---|---|---|---|---|---|---|---|
| 1st place, gold medalist(s) | Wilma Murto | Finland | – | o | xo | xo | x- | o | o | xo | r | 4.85 | =CR, NR |
| 2nd place, silver medalist(s) | Katerina Stefanidi | Greece | – | o | o | o | o | o | x- | xx | | 4.75 | SB |
| 3rd place, bronze medalist(s) | Tina Šutej | Slovenia | – | o | o | o | xo | o | xxx | | | 4.75 | |
| 4 | Caroline Bonde Holm | Denmark | o | xxo | o | xxx | | | | | | 4.55 | NR |
| 5 | Angelica Moser | Switzerland | – | xxo | o | xxx | | | | | | 4.55 | |
| 6 | Marie-Julie Bonnin | France | – | xo | xo | xxx | | | | | | 4.55 | PB |
| 7 | Roberta Bruni | Italy | o | o | xxo | xxx | | | | | | 4.55 | |
| 7 | Molly Caudery | Great Britain | o | o | xxo | xx- | x | | | | | 4.55 | |
| 9 | Sophie Cook | Great Britain | o | o | xxx | | | | | | | 4.40 | |
| 10 | Margot Chevrier | France | xxo | xo | xxx | | | | | | | 4.40 | |
| 11 | Elina Lampela | Finland | xo | xxo | xxx | | | | | | | 4.40 | |
| 12 | Lene Retzius | Norway | o | xxx | | | | | | | | 4.25 | |
