= 2026 European Athletics Championships – Women's pole vault =

Women's pole vault at the 2026 European Athletics Championships
- Venue: Alexander Stadium
- Location: Birmingham, United Kingdom
- Dates: 11 August 2026 (qualification); 13 August 2026 (final)
- Competitors: 30 (target)
- Winning height: 4.80 m =SB

Medalists
gold medal	Angelica Moser	Switzerland
silver medal	Wilma Heltelä	Finland
bronze medal	Marie-Julie Bonnin	France

The women's pole vault at the 2026 European Athletics Championships took place over two rounds at the Alexander Stadium in Birmingham, United Kingdom, on 11 and 13 August 2026.

== Background ==
Records before the 2026 European Athletics Championships
Record	Athlete (nation)	Height	Location	Date
World record	Yelena Isinbayeva (RUS)	5.06 m	Zürich, Switzerland	28 August 2009
European record	Yelena Isinbayeva (RUS)	5.06 m	Zürich, Switzerland	28 August 2009
Championship record	Katerina Stefanidi (GRE)	4.85 m	Berlin, Germany	9 August 2018
Championship record	Wilma Murto (FIN)	4.85 m	Munich, Germany	17 August 2022
World leading	Nina Kennedy (AUS)	4.95 m	Fontvieille, Monaco	10 July 2026
European leading	Polina Knoroz (RUS)	4.91 m	Cheboksary, Russia	20 June 2026

== Qualification ==
For the women's pole vault, the qualification period was from 27 July 2025 to 26 July 2026. Athletes qualified by achieving the entry standard of 4.60 m or better, by wildcard for the 2024 European Athletics Champion, or by their position on the World Athletics Rankings for the event. The target number was 30 athletes.

Qualification standings per 31 July 2026
QP	CP	Country	Athlete	Status	Details
1	1	Switzerland	Angelica Moser	Qualified by Wild Card	Defending European Champion
2	1	Finland	Wilma Heltelä	Qualified by Entry Standard	4.81 - Pl. Panathinaikou Stadiou, Athina (GRE) - 05 JUL 2026
3	1	Slovenia	Tina Šutej	Qualified by Entry Standard	4.80 - National Stadium, Tokyo (JPN) - 17 SEP 2025
4	1	France	Marie-Julie Bonnin	Qualified by Entry Standard	4.76 - Maison des Sports, Clermont-Ferrand (FRA) (i) - 22 FEB 2026
5	1	Norway	Lene Onsrud Retzius	Qualified by Entry Standard	4.73 - Untere Rheinwerft / Rheinuferpromenade, Düsseldorf (GER) - 10 AUG 2025
6	1	Belgium	Elien Vekemans	Qualified by Entry Standard	4.73 - Stadion, Jockgrim (GER) - 13 AUG 2025
7	2	Norway	Kitty Friele Faye	Qualified by Entry Standard	4.70 - Fana Stadion, Bergen (NOR) - 16 JUL 2026
8	2	Finland	Elina Lampela	Qualified by Entry Standard	4.64 - Oude Markt, Leuven (BEL) - 30 AUG 2025
9	1	Estonia	Marleen Mülla	Qualified by Entry Standard	4.63 - Bob Devaney Sports Center, Lincoln, NE (USA) (i) - 20 FEB 2026
10	1	Italy	Elisa Molinarolo	Qualified by Entry Standard	4.62 - Piazza Marcello d'Olivo, Lignano Sabbiadoro (ITA) - 23 AUG 2025
11	1	Hungary	Hanga Klekner	Qualified by Entry Standard	4.60 - Nemzeti Atlétikai Központ, Budapest (HUN) - 02 AUG 2025
12	1	Netherlands	Marijn Kieft	Qualified by Entry Standard	4.60 - ARV Ilion, Zoetermeer (NED) (i) - 17 JAN 2026
13	2	France	Bérénice Petit	Qualified by Entry Standard	4.60 - Stade Omnisports de La Source, Orléans (FRA) - 05 JUN 2026
14	1	Germany	Anjuli Knäsche	Qualified by Entry Standard	4.60 - Waldstadion, Walldorf (GER) - 19 JUL 2026
15	3	Finland	Saga Andersson	Qualified by World Rankings	19th - 1168 points
16	1	Greece	Aikaterini Stefanidi	Qualified by World Rankings	20th - 1167 points
17	2	Switzerland	Lea Bachmann	Qualified by World Rankings	21st - 1165 points
18	2	Greece	Ariadni Adamopoulou	Qualified by World Rankings	22nd - 1149 points
19	2	Netherlands	Elise de Jong	Qualified by World Rankings	24th - 1141 points
20	3	France	Margot Chevrier	Qualified by World Rankings	26th - 1133 points
21	1	Great Britain & N.I.	Gemma Tutton	Qualified by World Rankings	27th - 1132 points
22	1	Lithuania	Rugilė Miklyčiūtė	Qualified by World Rankings	30th - 1120 points
23	1	Sweden	Kajsa Roth	Qualified by World Rankings	31st - 1119 points
24	1	Poland	Zofia Gaborska	Qualified by World Rankings	32nd - 1118 points
25	1	Czech Republic	Apolena Švábíková	Qualified by World Rankings	33rd - 1116 points
26	2	Italy	Sonia Malavisi	Qualified by World Rankings	35th - 1113 points
27	2	Estonia	Allika Inkeri Moser	Qualified by World Rankings	36th - 1111 points
28	1	Ukraine	Maryna Kylypko	Qualified by World Rankings	37th - 1111 points
29	1	Spain	Mònica Clemente	Qualified by World Rankings	39th - 1107 points
30	3	Italy	Virginia Scardanzan	Qualified by World Rankings	41st - 1102 points
reserve	3	Greece	Iliana Triantafyllou	Next best by World Rankings	43rd - 1101 points
reserve	4	Italy	Great Nnachi	Next best by World Rankings	49th - 1088 points
reserve	2	Sweden	Sandra Alvero	Next best by World Rankings	56th - 1071 points
reserve	4	Finland	Tuuli Järvinen	Next best by World Rankings	85th - 1024 points

Bye to semi-finals	Reserve activated	Withdrawal / reserve unused

== Schedule ==
Date	Time	Round
11 August 2026	19:05	Qualification.
13 August 2026	19:50	Final

All times are local times (UTC+1)

== Results ==
=== Qualification ===
The qualification round was held on 11 August 2026, at 19:05 in the evening. All athletes meeting the Qualification Standard (Q) of 4.55 m or at least 12 best performers (q) advanced to the final.

==== Group A ====
Place	Athlete	Nation	4.10	4.25	4.40	4.50	Result	Notes
1	Aikaterini Stefanidi	Greece	-	o	o	o	4.50 m	q, SB
2	Angelica Moser	Switzerland	-	-	xo	o	4.50 m	q
3	Margot Chevrier	France	-	o	o	xxo	4.50 m	q
4	Marleen Mülla	Estonia	o	o	o	xxx	4.40 m	q
5	Hanga Klekner	Hungary	-	o	xo	xxx	4.40 m	q
6	Anjuli Knäsche	Germany	o	xo	xo	xxx	4.40 m	
6	Tina Šutej	Slovenia	-	xo	xo	xxx	4.40 m	
8	Saga Andersson	Finland	o	o	xxx		4.25 m	
8	Lene Onsrud Retzius	Norway	-	o	xxx		4.25 m	
8	Gemma Tutton	Great Britain & N.I.	o	o	xxx		4.25 m	
11	Virginia Scardanzan	Italy	o	xo	xxx		4.25 m	
12	Maryna Kylypko	Ukraine	xxo	xo	xxx		4.25 m	
13	Allika Inkeri Moser	Estonia	o	xxx			4.10 m	
13	Apolena ŠVábíková	Czech Republic	o	xxx			4.10 m	

==== Group B ====
Place	Athlete	Nation	4.10	4.25	4.40	4.50	Result	Notes
1	Marie-Julie Bonnin	France	-	-	o	o	4.50 m	q
2	Wilma Heltelä	Finland	-	-	xo	o	4.50 m	q
3	Elien Vekemans	Belgium	-	o	xo	xxx	4.50 m	q
4	Kajsa Roth	Sweden	o	o	xxo	xxo	4.50 m	q, PB
5	Rugilė Miklyčiūtė	Lithuania	o	o	o	xxr	4.40 m	q
5	Bérénice Petit	France	-	o	o	xxx	4.40 m	q
7	Ariadni Adamopoulou	Greece	xo	o	o	xxx	4.40 m	q
8	Monica Clemente	Spain	xo	xo	xo	xxx	4.40 m	
9	Lea Bachmann	Switzerland	o	o	xxx		4.25 m	SB
9	Elisa Molinarolo	Italy	o	o	xxx		4.25 m	
11	Zofia Gaborska	Poland	xo	o	xxx		4.25 m	
11	Sonia Malavisi	Italy	xo	o	xxx		4.25 m	
13	Marijn Kieft	Netherlands	o	xxx			4.10 m	
—	Kitty Friele Faye	Norway	-	-	xxx		NM	

=== Final ===
The final was held on 13 August 2026, at 19:50 in the evening.

Place	Athlete	Nation	4.30	4.45	4.60	4.70	4.75	4.80	4.85	Results	Notes
1st place, gold medalist(s)	Angelica Moser	Switzerland	-	o	o	o	o	o	xxx	4.80 m	=SB
2nd place, silver medalist(s)	Wilma Heltelä	Finland	-	o	o	o	o	x-	xx	4.75 m	
3rd place, bronze medalist(s)	Marie-Julie Bonnin	France	-	xo	xxo	xo	x-	x-	x	4.70 m	
4	Margot Chevrier	France	o	o	o	xxx				4.60 m	SB
4	Elien Vekemans	Belgium	o	o	o	xx-	x			4.60 m	SB
6	Aikaterini Stefanidi	Greece	o	o	xxo	xxx				4.60 m	SB
7	Hanga Klekner	Hungary	o	o	xxx					4.45 m	
7	Marleen Mülla	Estonia	o	o	xxx					4.45 m	
7	Bérénice Petit	France	o	o	xxx					4.45 m	
10	Kajsa Roth	Sweden	o	xo	xxx					4.45 m	
11	Ariadni Adamopoulou	Greece	o	xxx						4.30 m	
11	Rugilė Miklyčiūtė	Lithuania	o	xxx						4.30 m	
