= 2022 World Athletics Championships – Women's pole vault =

Women's pole vault at the 2022 World Championships
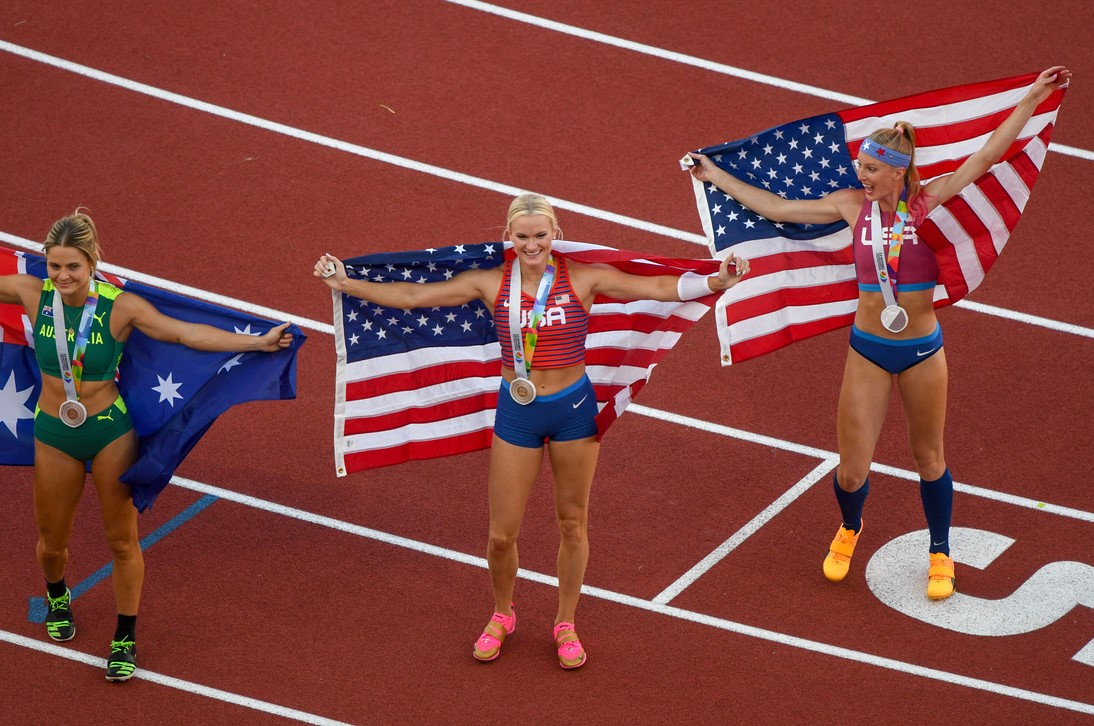
- The medalists shortly after the final.
- Venue: Hayward Field
- Dates: 15 July (qualification); 17 July (final)
- Competitors: 31 from 16 nations
- Winning height: 4.85

Medalists
gold medal	Katie Moon	United States
silver medal	Sandi Morris	United States
bronze medal	Nina Kennedy	Australia

Video on YouTube Official Video

The women's pole vault at the 2022 World Athletics Championships was held at the Hayward Field in Eugene on 15 and 17 July 2022.

== Summary ==
Out of 15 finalists, 7 survived to 4.60m, 5 of them still with perfect rounds going. By 4.70m, only 5 got over the bar, Olympic Champion Katie Moon needing two attempts, and 2016 Olympic Champion Katerina Stefanidi making it on her third and last attempt. Only Sandi Morris remained perfect. At 4.80m, Tina Šutej, Stefanidi and Nageotte missed their first attempt, while Nina Kennedy and Morris made it on their first attempt, putting Kennedy in second place behind Morris. Nageotte made her second attempt, Stefanidi strategically passed to the next height and Šutej exhausted her attempts. At 4.85m, Nageotte made her first attempt to leap from third into the lead. Both Kennedy and Morris aborted their first attempts mid-air going under the bar, while Stefanidi missed. On her second attempt, Morris had a little brush on the way down, but the bar stayed up. Kennedy had a credible near miss at what would have been a new personal best. When Stefanidi went under the bar on her final attempt, she dropped back to her last clearance at 4.70m to finish behind Šutej in fifth place. Kennedy passed her third attempt for an all or nothing jump at 4.90m but couldn't hit her marks under the pressure, running under the bar still collecting the bronze. Nageotte and Morris each made their three attempts at 4.90m, Morris coming the closest on her second attempt, but the results reverted to their final clearances at 4.85m, with Nageotte confirming her gold from the Olympics.

== Records ==
Before the competition records were as follows:

Record	Athlete & Nat.	Perf.	Location	Date
World record	Yelena Isinbayeva (RUS)	5.06 m	Zürich, Switzerland	28 August 2009
Championship record	Yelena Isinbayeva (RUS)	5.01 m	Helsinki, Finland	12 August 2005
World Leading	Sandi Morris (USA)	4.82 m	Eugene, United States	24 June 2022
African Record	Elmarie Gerryts (RSA)	4.42 m	Wesel, Germany	12 June 2000
Asian Record	Li Ling (CHN)	4.72 m	Shanghai, China	18 May 2019
North, Central American and Caribbean record	Jennifer Suhr (USA)	5.02 m	Albuquerque, United States	2 March 2013
South American Record	Fabiana Murer (BRA)	4.87 m	Sao Bernardo do Campo, Brazil	3 July 2016
European Record	Yelena Isinbayeva (RUS)	5.06 m	Zürich, Switzerland	28 August 2009
Oceanian record	Eliza McCartney (NZL)	4.94 m	Jockgrim, Germany	17 July 2018

== Qualification standard ==
The standard to qualify automatically for entry was 4.70 m.

== Schedule ==
The event schedule, in local time (UTC−7), was as follows:

Date	Time	Round
15 July	17:20	Qualification
17 July	17:25	Final

== Results ==
=== Qualification ===
Qualification: 4.65 m (Q) or at least 12 best performers (q).

Rank	Group	Name	Nationality	4.20	4.35	4.50	4.60	4.65	Mark	Notes
1	A	Xu Huiqin	China	–	o	o			4.50	q
1	A	Katie Moon	United States	–	–	o			4.50	q
1	A	Wilma Murto	Finland	–	o	o			4.50	q
1	B	Ninon Chapelle	France	–	o	o			4.50	q
1	B	Sandi Morris	United States	–	–	o			4.50	q
1	B	Jacqueline Otchere	Germany	o	o	o			4.50	q, SB
1	B	Katerina Stefanidi	Greece	–	–	o			4.50	q
1	B	Nina Kennedy	Australia	–	–	o			4.50	q
9	A	Olivia McTaggart	New Zealand	–	o	xo			4.50	q
10	A	Margot Chevrier	France	–	o	xxo			4.50	q
10	B	Anicka Newell	Canada	o	o	xxo			4.50	q, SB
12	A	Tina Šutej	Slovenia	–	o	xxx			4.35	q
12	A	Li Ling	China	o	o	xxx			4.35	q, SB
12	B	Gabriela Leon	United States	o	o	xxx			4.35	q
12	B	Angelica Moser	Switzerland	–	o	xxx			4.35	q
16	A	Maryna Kylypko	Ukraine	o	xo	xxx			4.35	
16	A	Saga Andersson	Finland	o	xo	xxx			4.35	
16	A	Alysha Newman	Canada	–	xo	xxx			4.35	
16	A	Elisa Molinarolo	Italy	o	xo	xxx			4.35	
16	B	Roberta Bruni	Italy	–	xo	xxx			4.35	
16	B	Lisa Gunnarsson	Sweden	o	xo	xxx			4.35	
22	A	Eleni-Klaoudia Polak	Greece	xo	xo	xxx			4.35	
23	B	Yana Hladiychuk	Ukraine	o	xxo	xxx			4.35	
24	A	Nikoleta Kyriakopoulou	Greece	xo	xxo	xxx			4.35	
25	B	Molly Caudery	Great Britain & N.I.	o	xxx				4.20	
26	A	Amálie Švábíková	Czech Republic	xo	xxx				4.20	
26	B	Elina Lampela	Finland	xo	xxx				4.20	
26	B	Niu Chunge	China	xo	xxx				4.20	
	A	Holly Bradshaw	Great Britain & N.I.	–	–	r			NM	
	B	Imogen Ayris	New Zealand	xxx					NM	

=== Final ===
The final was started on 17 July at 17:10.

Rank	Name	Nationality	4.30	4.45	4.60	4.70	4.80	4.85	4.90	Mark	Notes
1st place, gold medalist(s)	Katie Moon	United States	–	o	o	xo	xo	o	xxx	4.85	WL
2nd place, silver medalist(s)	Sandi Morris	United States	–	o	o	o	o	xo	xxx	4.85	WL
3rd place, bronze medalist(s)	Nina Kennedy	Australia	–	xxo	o	o	o	xx-	x	4.80	SB
4	Tina Šutej	Slovenia	o	o	xxo	o	xxx			4.70	
5	Katerina Stefanidi	Greece	–	o	o	xxo	x-	xx		4.70	SB
6	Li Ling	China	o	o	o	xxx				4.60	SB
6	Wilma Murto	Finland	o	o	o	xxx				4.60	SB
8	Angelica Moser	Switzerland	o	xxo	o	xxx				4.60	
9	Anicka Newell	Canada	o	o	xxx					4.45	
10	Jacqueline Otchere	Germany	xo	o	xxx					4.45	
11	Ninon Chapelle	France	xo	o	xxx					4.45	
12	Gabriela Leon	United States	o	xxx						4.30	
13	Xu Huiqin	China	xo	xxx						4.30	
	Margot Chevrier	France	–	xxx						NM	
	Olivia McTaggart	New Zealand	xxx							NM	
