= 2025 World Athletics Championships – Women's pole vault =

Women's pole vault at the 2025 World Athletics Championships
- Venue: National Stadium
- Location: Tokyo, Japan
- Dates: 15 September (qualification); 17 September (final)
- Winning height: 4.90 m SB

Medalists
gold medal	Katie Moon	United States
silver medal	Sandi Morris	United States
bronze medal	Tina Šutej	Slovenia

The women's pole vault at the 2025 World Athletics Championships was held at the National Stadium in Tokyo on 15 and 17 September 2025.

== Summary ==
They expected thirty entrants for the competition, but co-defending champion and Olympic Gold medalist Nina Kennedy dropped out at the last minute when a nagging injury did not recover in time. Co-champion because 2023 ended with Kennedy and Katie Moon deciding to not break the tie and share the medal. Moon was also the 2022 champion and Olympic silver medalist. Olympic bronze medalist Alysha Newman was also injured. Wilma Murto is the returning bronze medalist. Also here is Sandi Morris, a member of the 5 metres club, with silvers from 2017, 2019 and 2022, plus the 2016 Olympics.

In the qualification round, 5 couldn't get over 4.25m including Murto. Former World Indoor Champion Molly Caudery did not start. With the auto qualifier 4.70m, they stopped the A group vaulting at 4.60m with seven over. The B group also got seven over 4.60m taking 14 to the final.

In the final, 2016 Olympic bronze medalist Eliza McCartney had to withdraw before clearing a height. 9 made it over 4.65m, but only 4 made it over 4.75m, Amálie Švábíková and Tina Šutej on their last attempt. Morris and Moon still had clean rounds going. At 4.80m, Moon made her first attempt while Morris and Šutej took two putting Moon in the lead. After missing two, Švábíková passed to try a last attempt at 4.85m which failed settling the medalists. Moon missed her first attempt at 4.85m. When Morris cleared on her first attempt, to seize the lead, Moon passed. Šutej took all three of her attempts a 4.85m and after missing them settled for the bronze. Now at 4.90m, Morris and Moon missed their first attempts, then Morris her second. Moon was down to her final attempt. Moon went up and hit the bar with her chest on the way down. The bar danced and landed back on the pegs. Moon had taken the lead back. Morris walked to the table to pass to the next height. When she missed, Morris was the silver medalist. Already with gold, Moon had the bar moved to the championship record 5.01m. After one shot at it, she withdrew with a threepeat.

== Records ==
Before the competition records were as follows:

Record	Athlete & Nat.	Perf.	Location	Date
World Record	Yelena Isinbayeva (RUS)	5.06 m	Zürich, Switzerland	28 August 2009
Championship Record	Yelena Isinbayeva (RUS)	5.01 m	Helsinki, Finland	12 August 2005
World Leading	Amanda Moll (USA)	4.91 m	Indianapolis, United States	28 February 2025
African Record	Elmarie Gerryts (RSA)	4.42 m	Wesel, Germany	12 June 2000
Asian Record	Li Ling (CHN)	4.72 m	Shanghai, China	18 May 2019
European Record	Yelena Isinbayeva (RUS)	5.06 m	Zürich, Switzerland	28 August 2009
North, Central American and Caribbean Record	Jennifer Suhr (USA)	5.02 m	Albuquerque, United States	2 March 2013
South American Record	Fabiana Murer (BRA)	4.87 m	Sao Bernardo do Campo, Brazil	3 July 2016
Oceanian Record	Eliza McCartney (NZL)	4.94 m	Jockgrim, Germany	17 July 2018

== Qualification standard ==
The standard to qualify automatically for entry was 4.73 m.

== Schedule ==
The event schedule, in local time (UTC+9), was as follows:

Date	Time	Round
15 September	09:05	Qualification
17 September	20:10	Final

== Results ==
=== Qualification ===
All athletes over 4.70 m ( Q ) or at least the 12 best performers ( q ) advanced to the final.

==== Group A ====
Rank	Name	Nationality	4.25	4.45	4.60	4.70	Mark	Notes
1	Imogen Ayris	New Zealand	o	o	o		4.60 m	q
1	Juliana de Menis Campos	Brazil	o	o	o		4.60 m	q
3	Roberta Bruni	Italy	o	xo	o		4.60 m	q
3	Katie Moon	United States	-	xo	o		4.60 m	q
5	Niu Chunge	China	xo	xo	o		4.60 m	q
6	Amálie Švábíková	Czech Republic	-	o	xo		4.60 m	q
7	Hana Moll	United States	xo	xxo	xo		4.60 m	q
8	Elina Lampela	Finland	x	o	xxx		4.45 m	
9	Lea Bachmann	Switzerland	xxo	o	xxx		4.45 m	
10	Kitty Friele Faye	Norway	o	xo	xxx		4.45 m	
10	Kajsa Roth	Sweden	o	xo	xxx		4.45 m	PB
10	Elien Vekemans	Belgium	o	xo	xxx		4.45 m	
13	Marleen Mülla	Estonia	xxo	xxx			4.25 m	
–	Yana Hladiychuk	Ukraine	xxx				NM	
–	Jennifer Elizarov	Canada	xxx				NM	
–	Miré Reinstorf	South Africa	xxx				NM	
–	Molly Caudery	Great Britain & N.I.					DNS	

==== Group B ====
Rank	Name	Nationality	4.25	4.45	4.60	4.70	Mark	Notes
1	Amanda Moll	United States	o	o	o		4.60 m	q
1	Sandi Morris	United States	-	o	o		4.60 m	q
1	Angelica Moser	Switzerland	-	o	o		4.60 m	q
1	Tina Šutej	Slovenia	o	o	o		4.60 m	q
5	Eliza McCartney	New Zealand	o	xo	o		4.60 m	q
6	Marie-Julie Bonnin	France	-	o	xo		4.60 m	q
7	Olivia McTaggart	New Zealand	o	o	xxo		4.60 m	q
8	Elisa Molinarolo	Italy	xo	xo	xxx		4.45 m	
9	Maryna Kylypko	Ukraine	o	xxo	xxx		4.45 m	
9	Pascale Stöcklin	Switzerland	o	xxo	xxx		4.45 m	
9	Lene Onsrud Retzius	Norway	o	xxo	xxx		4.45 m	
12	Ariadni Adamopoulou	Greece	o	xxx			4.25 m	
13	Hanga Klekner	Hungary	xo	xxx			4.25 m	
14	Saga Andersson	Finland	xxo	xxx			4.25 m	
14	Misaki Morota	Japan	xxo	xxx			4.25 m	
–	Beatriz Chagas	Brazil	xxx				NM	
–	Wilma Murto	Finland	xxx				NM	

=== Final ===
Rank	Name	Nationality	4.45	4.65	4.75	4.80	4.85	4.90	4.95	5.01	Mark	Notes
1st place, gold medalist(s)	Katie Moon	United States	o	o	o	o	x–	xo	–	xr	4.90	SB
2nd place, silver medalist(s)	Sandi Morris	United States	o	o	o	xo	o	xx–	x		4.85	SB
3rd place, bronze medalist(s)	Tina Šutej	Slovenia	o	o	xxo	xo	xxx				4.80	SB
4	Amálie Švábíková	Czech Republic	o	o	xxo	xx–	x				4.75	SB
5	Angelica Moser	Switzerland	o	o	xxx						4.65	
6	Hana Moll	United States	o	xo	xxx						4.65	
6	Amanda Moll	United States	o	xo	xxx						4.65	
8	Marie-Julie Bonnin	France	xo	xo	xxx						4.65	
8	Olivia McTaggart	New Zealand	xo	xo	xxx						4.65	
10	Imogen Ayris	New Zealand	o	xxx							4.45	
11	Roberta Bruni	Italy	xo	xxx							4.45	
11	Niu Chunge	China	xo	xxx							4.45	
	Juliana de Menis Campos	Brazil	xxx								NM	
	Eliza McCartney	New Zealand	x–	r							NM	
