= 2017 European Athletics U23 Championships – Women's pole vault =

The women's pole vault event at the 2017 European Athletics U23 Championships was held in Bydgoszcz, Poland, at Zdzisław Krzyszkowiak Stadium on 13 and 15 July.

== Medalists ==
Gold	Angelica Moser; Switzerland
Silver	Maryna Kylypko; Ukraine
Bronze	Lucy Bryan; Great Britain

== Results ==
=== Qualification ===
13 July

Qualification rule: 4.20 (Q) or the 12 best results (q) qualified for the final.

Rank	Group	Name	Nationality	3.70	3.85	4.00	4.10	4.15	4.20	Results	Notes
1	A	Friedelinde Petershofen	Germany	–	–	–	o	–	o	4.20	Q
1	A	Kamila Przybyła	Poland	–	–	o	o	o	o	4.20	Q
1	B	Ninon Guillon-Romarin	France	–	–	–	–	o	o	4.20	Q
1	B	Maryna Kylypko	Ukraine	–	–	o	o	–	o	4.20	Q
5	A	Lucy Bryan	Great Britain	–	–	o	o	xo	o	4.20	Q
5	B	Killiana Heymans	Netherlands	–	o	o	xo	o	o	4.20	Q
5	B	Demet Parlak	Turkey	–	o	o	o	xo	o	4.20	Q, SB
8	A	Mallaury Sautereau	France	–	o	xo	xxo	o	o	4.20	Q
9	A	Angelica Moser	Switzerland	–	–	–	–	–	xo	4.20	Q
9	B	Lene Retzius	Norway	–	o	o	o	o	xo	4.20	Q
11	B	Malen Ruiz de Azua	Spain	–	o	xo	o	o	xo	4.20	Q
12	B	Pascale Stöcklin	Switzerland	–	o	xo	o	xo	xo	4.20	Q, PB
13	B	Eleni-Klaoudia Polak	Greece	–	–	o	o	xxo	xxo	4.20	Q
14	A	Rebeka Šilhanová	Czech Republic	–	o	xo	o	xo	xxx	4.15	SB
15	A	Monica Clemente	Spain	o	o	xo	xo	xxx		4.10	
15	A	Charlotte Gaudy	France	–	o	xo	xo	xxx		4.10	
17	B	Lea Bachmann	Switzerland	–	xo	xo	xxx			4.00	=SB
18	B	Zuzana Pražáková	Czech Republic	o	o	xxo	xxx			4.00	
19	A	Martina Fileš	Croatia	o	xo	xxo	xxx			4.00	=NU23R
20	A	Sarah McKeever	Ireland	o	o	xxx				3.85	
21	A	Helen Falda	Italy	–	xo	xxx				3.85	
21	A	Hanna Jansson	Sweden	o	xo	xxx				3.85	
21	A	Krisztina Szűcs	Hungary	o	xo	xxx				3.85	
	B	Elien De Vocht	Belgium	–	xxx					NM	
	B	Wiktoria Wojewódzka	Poland	xxx						NM	

=== Final ===
15 July

Rank	Name	Nationality	4.00	4.10	4.20	4.25	4.30	4.35	4.40	4.45	4.50	4.55	4.65	Result	Notes
1st place, gold medalist(s)	Angelica Moser	Switzerland	–	–	o	–	–	xo	–	o	xxo	o	xxx	4.55	
2nd place, silver medalist(s)	Maryna Kylypko	Ukraine	–	xo	o	–	xo	–	xo	o	x–	xx		4.45	
3rd place, bronze medalist(s)	Lucy Bryan	Great Britain	–	o	xo	–	xo	xo	xo	xxx				4.40	=PB
4	Kamila Przybyła	Poland	–	xo	o	–	o	–	xxo	–	xxx			4.40	PB
5	Ninon Guillon-Romarin	France	–	–	xo	–	–	o	–	xxx				4.35	
6	Lene Retzius	Norway	o	xo	o	–	o	xxo	xxx					4.35	=NU23R
7	Friedelinde Petershofen	Germany	–	o	o	–	o	–	xxx					4.30	
7	Mallaury Sautereau	France	o	–	o	–	o	xxx						4.30	
9	Killiana Heymans	Netherlands	o	o	o	xxx								4.20	
9	Malen Ruiz de Azua	Spain	o	o	o	–	xxx							4.20	
11	Eleni-Klaoudia Polak	Greece	xo	o	o	xxx								4.20	
12	Demet Parlak	Turkey	o	–	xxx									4.00	
12	Pascale Stöcklin	Switzerland	o	xxx										4.00	
