= Finland at the 2025 World Athletics Championships =

- Flag of Finland
- WA code: FIN

in Tokyo, Japan 13 September 2025 – 21 September 2025
- Competitors: 28 (7 men and 21 women)
- Medals: Gold 0 Silver 0 Bronze 0 Total 0

World Athletics Championships appearances
- 1976; 1980; 1983; 1987; 1991; 1993; 1995; 1997; 1999; 2001; 2003; 2005; 2007; 2009; 2011; 2013; 2015; 2017; 2019; 2022; 2023; 2025

Finland competed at the 2025 World Athletics Championships in Tokyo, Japan, from 13 to 21 September 2025. Finland entered 28 athletes.

== Results ==
Key

- Q = Qualified for the next round
- q = Qualified for the next round as a fastest loser or, in field events, by position without achieving the qualifying target
- NR = National record
- PB = Personal best
- SB = Season best
- N/A = Round not applicable for the event

=== Men ===
Track and road events

Athlete	Event	Heat		Semifinal		Final	
Athlete	Event	Result	Rank	Result	Rank	Result	Rank
Jerry Jokinen	20 kilometres walk	—N/a				1:24:37	37
Aku Partanen	20 kilometres walk	—N/a				1:21:41 SB	25

Field events

Athlete	Event	Qualification		Final	
Athlete	Event	Distance	Position	Distance	Position
Urho Kujanpää	Pole vault	NM		Did not advance	
Henri Liipola	Hammer throw	73.82	21	Did not advance	
Lassi Etelätalo	Javelin throw	81.33	17	Did not advance	
Oliver Helander	Javelin throw	79.75	23	Did not advance	
Eemil Porvari	Javelin throw	78.51	27	Did not advance	

=== Women ===
Track and road events

Athlete	Event	Heat		Semifinal		Final	
Athlete	Event	Result	Rank	Result	Rank	Result	Rank
Mette Baas	400 metres	51.92	6	Did not advance			
Eveliina Määttänen	800 metres	2:02.55	8	Did not advance			
Alisa Vainio	Marathon	—N/a				2:28:32 SB	5
Lotta Harala	100 metres hurdles	12.86	4 q	DQ		Did not advance	
Saara Keskitalo	100 metres hurdles	12.95	5 q	13.02	8	Did not advance	
Kristiina Halonen	400 metres hurdles	55.42	6	Did not advance			
Hilla Uusimäki	400 metres hurdles	55.52	5	Did not advance			
Ilona Mononen	3000 metres steeplechase	9:21.02 NR	8	—N/a		Did not advance	

Field events

Athlete	Event	Qualification		Final	
Athlete	Event	Distance	Position	Distance	Position
Ella Junnila	High jump	NM		Did not advance	
Saga Andersson	Pole vault	4.25	26	Did not advance	
Elina Lampela	Pole vault	4.45	15	Did not advance	
Wilma Murto	Pole vault	NM		Did not advance	
Senni Salminen	Triple jump	13.77	20	Did not advance	
Emilia Kangas	Shot put	18.07	15	Did not advance	
Senja Mäkitörmä	Shot put	17.31	27	Did not advance	
Eveliina Rouvali	Shot put	17.10	28	Did not advance	
Silja Kosonen	Hammer throw	75.88	2 Q	75.28	4
Suvi Niiranen	Hammer throw	66.37	31	Did not advance	
Krista Tervo	Hammer throw	73.73	5 q	NM	

Combined events – Heptathlon

Athlete	Event	100H	HJ	SP	200 m	LJ	JT	800 m	Final	Rank
Saga Vanninen	Result	13.44	1.80	14.59	24.78	5.97	47.14 SB	2:09.33 PB	6396	7
Saga Vanninen	Points	1059	978	833	907	840	805	974	6396	7
