= 2025 Athletissima =

Athletics meeting in Lausanne, Switzerland

- Dates: 19-20 August 2025
- Host city: Lausanne, Switzerland
- Venue: Stade Olympique de la Pontaise
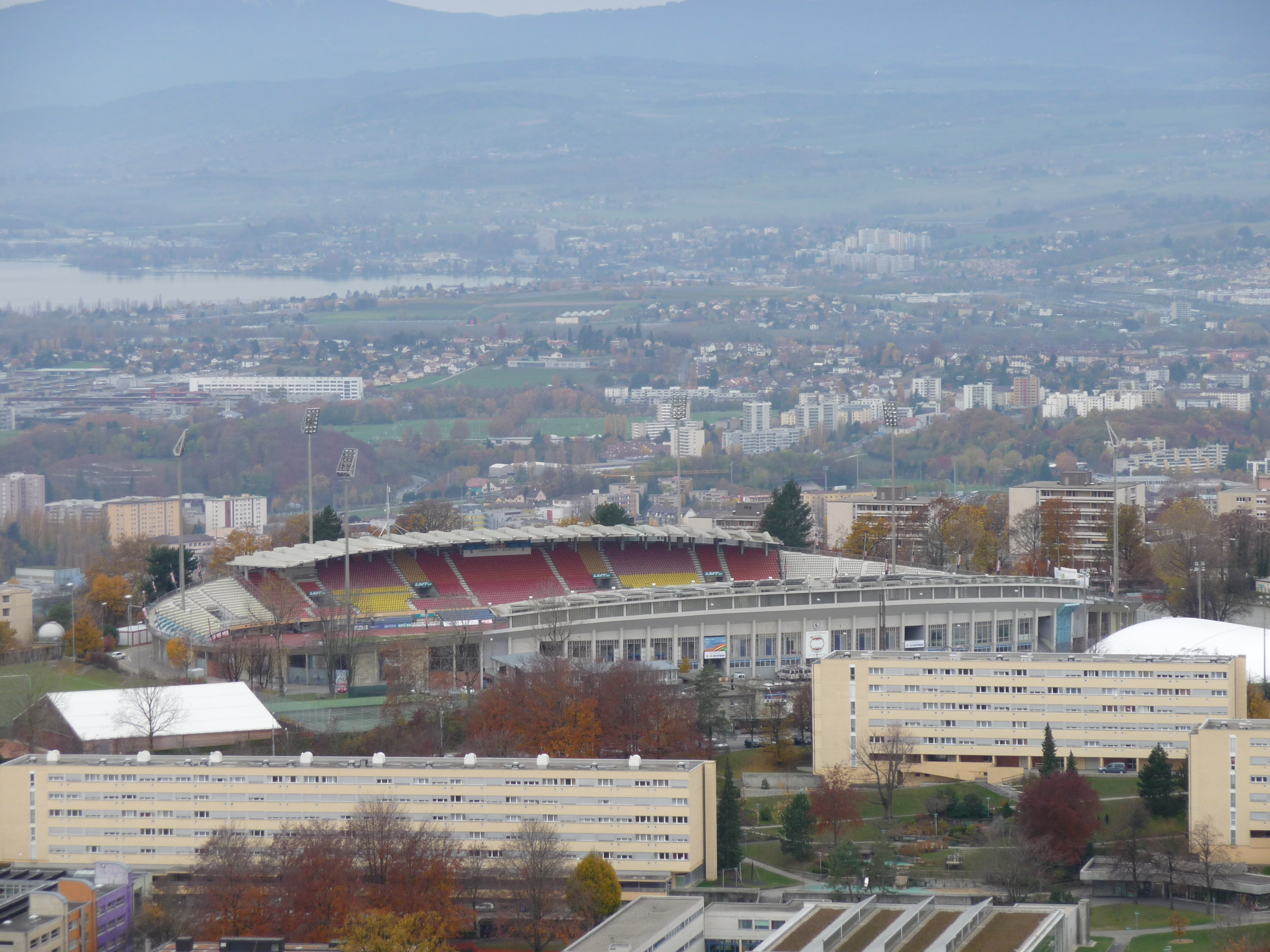
- Level: 2025 Diamond League

The 2025 Athletissima was the 49th edition of the annual outdoor track and field meeting in Lausanne, Switzerland. Held on 19 and 20 August at the Stade Olympique de la Pontaise, it was the thirteenth leg of the 2025 Diamond League – the highest level international track and field circuit.

== Diamond+ events results ==
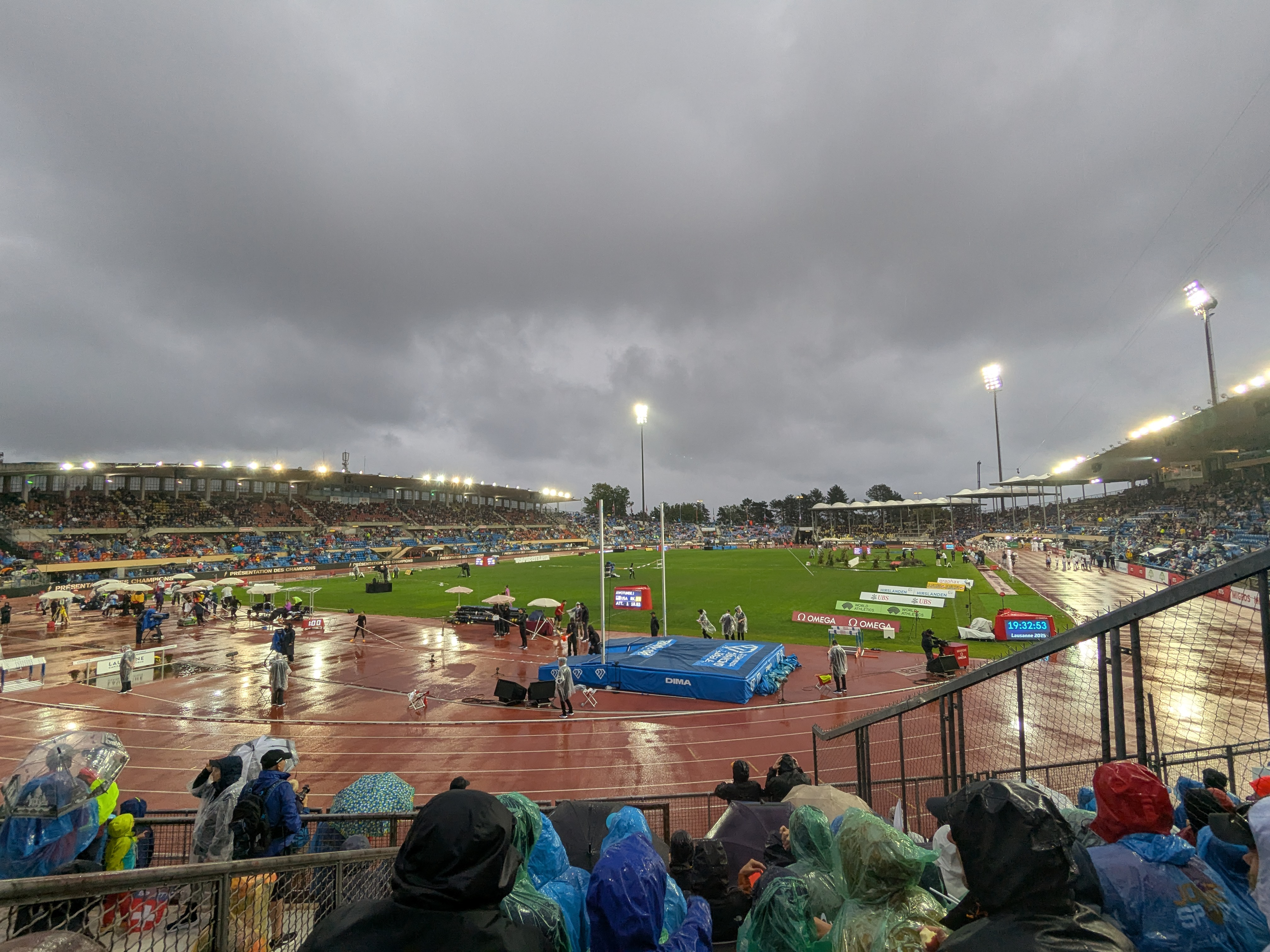
View of the stadium during the meeting.

Starting in 2025 a new discipline of events was added called Diamond+, these 4 events per meet awarded athletes with increased prize money whilst keeping the standard points format to qualify for the Diamond league finals. First place earns 8 points, with each step down in place earning one less point than the previous, until no points are awarded in 9th place or lower. In the case of a tie, each tying athlete earns the full amount of points for the place.

=== Men's ===
100 metres
Place	Athlete	Nation	Time	Points	Notes
1st place, gold medalist(s)	Oblique Seville	Jamaica	9.87	8	
2nd place, silver medalist(s)	Noah Lyles	United States	10.02 [.014]	7	
3rd place, bronze medalist(s)	Ackeem Blake	Jamaica	10.02 [.016]	6	
4	Akani Simbine	South Africa	10.05	5	
5	Zharnel Hughes	Great Britain	10.09	4	
6	Brandon Hicklin	United States	10.20	3	
7	Courtney Lindsey	United States	10.27	2	
8	Timothé Mumenthaler	Switzerland	10.41	1	
			Wind: (−0.3 m/s)		

800 metres
Place	Athlete	Nation	Time	Points	Notes
1st place, gold medalist(s)	Josh Hoey	United States	1:42.82	8	
2nd place, silver medalist(s)	Emmanuel Wanyonyi	Kenya	1:43.29	7	
3rd place, bronze medalist(s)	Mohamed Attaoui	Spain	1:43.38	6	
4	Max Burgin	Great Britain	1:43.44	5	
5	Marco Arop	Canada	1:43.91	4	
6	Tshepiso Masalela	Botswana	1:44.51	3	
7	Yanis Meziane	France	1:44.77	2	
8	Ivan Pelizza	Switzerland	1:45.52	1	
9	Bryce Hoppel	United States	1:48.18		
—	Guy Learmonth	Great Britain	DNF		PM

=== Women's ===
400 metres
Place	Athlete	Nation	Time	Points	Notes
1st place, gold medalist(s)	Henriette Jæger	Norway	50.09	8	
2nd place, silver medalist(s)	Lieke Klaver	Netherlands	50.17	7	
3rd place, bronze medalist(s)	Isabella Whittaker	United States	50.63	6	
4	Alexis Holmes	United States	50.73	5	
5	Salwa Eid Naser	Bahrain	51.08	4	
6	Natalia Bukowiecka	Poland	51.19	3	
7	Britton Wilson	United States	51.69	2	
8	Sada Williams	Barbados	53.05	1	

100 metres hurdles
Place	Athlete	Nation	Time	Points	Notes
1st place, gold medalist(s)	Nadine Visser	Netherlands	12.45	8	
2nd place, silver medalist(s)	Masai Russell	United States	12.53	7	
3rd place, bronze medalist(s)	Ditaji Kambundji	Switzerland	12.54	6	
4	Ackera Nugent	Jamaica	12.57	5	
5	Tobi Amusan	Nigeria	12.82	4	
6	Alaysha Johnson	United States	12.94	3	
7	Megan Tapper	Jamaica	13.06	2	
8	Kendra Harrison	United States	13.20	1	
			Wind: (−0.5 m/s)		

== Diamond events results ==
=== Men's ===
5000 metres
Place	Athlete	Nation	Time	Points	Notes
1st place, gold medalist(s)	Isaac Kimeli	Belgium	13:07.67	8	
2nd place, silver medalist(s)	Grant Fisher	United States	13:08.51	7	
3rd place, bronze medalist(s)	Eduardo Herrera	Mexico	13:09.50	6	
4	Samuel Tefera	Ethiopia	13:09.80	5	
5	Ishmael Kipkurui	Kenya	13:09.82	4	
6	Edwin Kurgat	Kenya	13:09.91	4	SB
7	Hagos Gebrhiwet	Ethiopia	13:10.08	3	
8	Graham Blanks	United States	13:12.94	2	
9	Abdisa Fayisa	Ethiopia	13:13.16	1	PB
10	Denis Kipkoech	Kenya	13:13.97		
11	Mezgebu Sime	Ethiopia	13:14.92		
12	Thierry Ndikumwenayo	Spain	13:16.78		
13	Birhanu Balew	Bahrain	13:17.75		
14	Jacob Krop	Kenya	13:18.65		
15	Jonas Raess	Switzerland	13:28.89		
16	Jack Rayner	Australia	13:31.22		
17	Luis Grijalva	Guatemala	13:34.15		
18	Brian Fay	Ireland	13:36.61		
—	Telahun Haile Bekele	Ethiopia	DNF		
—	Jude Thomas	Australia	DNF		PM
—	Mounir Akbache	France	DNF		PM

110 metres hurdles
Place	Athlete	Nation	Time	Points	Notes
1st place, gold medalist(s)	Cordell Tinch	United States	12.98	8	
2nd place, silver medalist(s)	Jamal Britt	United States	13.13	7	
3rd place, bronze medalist(s)	Trey Cunningham	United States	13.19	6	
4	Lorenzo Simonelli	Italy	13.21	5	
5	Just Kwaou-Mathey	France	13.25	4	
6	Jason Joseph	Switzerland	13.28	3	
7	Dylan Beard	United States	13.30	2	
8	Enrique Llopis	Spain	13.33	1	
			Wind: (+0.3 m/s)		

Pole vault
Place	Athlete	Nation	Height	Points	Notes
1st place, gold medalist(s)	Emmanouil Karalis	Greece	6.02 m	8	
2nd place, silver medalist(s)	Thibaut Collet	France	5.82 m	7	
2nd place, silver medalist(s)	Renaud Lavillenie	France	5.82 m	7	
4	Ersu Şaşma	Turkey	5.82 m	5	
5	Menno Vloon	Netherlands	5.82 m	4	
6	Sam Kendricks	United States	5.72 m	3	
7	Ben Broeders	Belgium	5.62 m	2	
7	Austin Miller	United States	5.62 m	2	
9	Sondre Guttormsen	Norway	5.42 m		
—	Kurtis Marschall	Australia	NM		

Long jump
Place	Athlete	Nation	Distance	Points	Notes
1st place, gold medalist(s)	Anvar Anvarov	Uzbekistan	7.84 m (−0.3 m/s)	8	
2nd place, silver medalist(s)	Simon Ehammer	Switzerland	7.72 m (−0.7 m/s)	7	
3rd place, bronze medalist(s)	Tajay Gayle	Jamaica	7.71 m (−0.7 m/s)	6	
4	Carey McLeod	Jamaica	7.67 m (−0.5 m/s)	5	
5	Wayne Pinnock	Jamaica	7.61 m (−0.6 m/s)	4	
6	Mattia Furlani	Italy	7.60 m (−0.1 m/s)	3	
7	Miltiadis Tentoglou	Greece	7.52 m (−0.3 m/s)	2	
8	Liam Adcock	Australia	7.50 m (−0.7 m/s)	1	
9	Gerson Baldé	Portugal	7.37 m (+0.7 m/s)		

Shot put
Place	Athlete	Nation	Distance	Points	Notes
1st place, gold medalist(s)	Joe Kovacs	United States	22.04 m	8	
2nd place, silver medalist(s)	Leonardo Fabbri	Italy	21.77 m	7	
3rd place, bronze medalist(s)	Adrian Piperi	United States	21.49 m	6	
4	Tom Walsh	New Zealand	21.47 m	5	
5	Roger Steen	United States	21.28 m	4	
6	Payton Otterdahl	United States	21.24 m	3	
7	Chukwuebuka Enekwechi	Nigeria	21.19 m	2	
8	Rajindra Campbell	Jamaica	21.00 m	1	
9	Josh Awotunde	United States	20.15 m		
10	Zane Weir	Italy	19.77 m		

=== Women's ===
200 metres
Place	Athlete	Nation	Time	Points	Notes
1st place, gold medalist(s)	Brittany Brown	United States	22.23	8	
2nd place, silver medalist(s)	Favour Ofili	Nigeria	22.31	7	
3rd place, bronze medalist(s)	Marie Josée Ta Lou-Smith	Ivory Coast	22.37	6	SB
4	Marileidy Paulino	Dominican Republic	22.43	5	
5	Dina Asher-Smith	Great Britain	22.64	4	
6	McKenzie Long	United States	22.69	3	
7	Daryll Neita	Great Britain	22.73	2	
8	Léonie Pointet	Switzerland	23.23	1	
			Wind: (+ m/s)		

800 metres
Place	Athlete	Nation	Time	Points	Notes
1st place, gold medalist(s)	Keely Hodgkinson	Great Britain	1:55.69	8	MR
2nd place, silver medalist(s)	Audrey Werro	Switzerland	1:57.34	7	
3rd place, bronze medalist(s)	Georgia Hunter Bell	Great Britain	1:57.55	6	
4	Anaïs Bourgoin	France	1:58.43	5	
5	Oratile Nowe	Botswana	1:58.63	4	
6	Prudence Sekgodiso	South Africa	1:58.76	3	
7	Claudia Hollingsworth	Australia	1:58.81	2	
8	Rénelle Lamote	France	1:59.60	1	
9	Addison Wiley	United States	1:59.64		
—	Eveline Saalberg	Netherlands	DNF		PM

3000 metres steeplechase
Place	Athlete	Nation	Time	Points	Notes
1st place, gold medalist(s)	Doris Lemngole	Kenya	9:16.36	8	
2nd place, silver medalist(s)	Sembo Almayew	Ethiopia	9:20.39	7	
3rd place, bronze medalist(s)	Olivia Markezich	United States	9:20.73	6	
4	Elise Thorner	Great Britain	9:21.74	5	
5	Courtney Wayment	United States	9:26.89	4	
6	Alemnat Walle	Ethiopia	9:28.91	3	
7	Kinga Królik	Poland	9:31.69	2	
8	Rihab Dhahri	Tunisia	9:32.91	1	
9	Wosane Asefa	Ethiopia	9:33.27		
10	Gabrielle Jennings	United States	9:51.03		
—	Valerie Constien	United States	DNF		
—	Lea Meyer	Germany	DNF		

High jump
Place	Athlete	Nation	Height	Points	Notes
1st place, gold medalist(s)	Christina Honsel	Germany	1.91 m	8	
1st place, gold medalist(s)	Nicola Olyslagers	Australia	1.91 m	8	
1st place, gold medalist(s)	Maria Żodzik	Poland	1.91 m	8	
4	Eleanor Patterson	Australia	1.91 m	5	
5	Morgan Lake	Great Britain	1.86 m	4	
6	Yuliya Levchenko	Ukraine	1.86 m	3	
6	Imke Onnen	Germany	1.86 m	3	
6	Angelina Topić	Serbia	1.86 m	3	
9	Nafissatou Thiam	Belgium	1.81 m		
—	Yaroslava Mahuchikh	Ukraine	NM		

Javelin throw
Place	Athlete	Nation	Distance	Points	Notes
1st place, gold medalist(s)	Adriana Vilagoš	Serbia	63.02 m	8	
2nd place, silver medalist(s)	Jo-Ané du Plessis	South Africa	58.89 m	8	
3rd place, bronze medalist(s)	Elina Tzengko	Greece	58.82 m	8	
4	Sigrid Borge	Norway	58.10 m	5	
5	Mackenzie Little	Australia	56.15 m	4	
6	Maria Andrejczyk	Poland	54.71 m	3	
7	Flor Ruiz	Colombia	53.97 m	3	
8	Victoria Hudson	Austria	53.92 m	3	
9	Anete Sietina	Latvia	53.22 m		
10	Haruka Kitaguchi	Japan	50.93 m		

== Promotional events results ==
=== Men's ===
400 metres hurdles
Place	Athlete	Nation	Time	Notes
1st place, gold medalist(s)	Ezekiel Nathaniel	Nigeria	48.08	
2nd place, silver medalist(s)	Trevor Bassitt	United States	48.14	=SB
3rd place, bronze medalist(s)	Matic Ian Guček	Slovenia	49.23	
4	Berke Akçam	Turkey	49.48	
5	Alastair Chalmers	Great Britain	49.92	
6	Julien Bonvin	Switzerland	50.13	
7	Patrik Dömötör	Slovakia	50.20	
8	Vít Müller	Czech Republic	50.42	

=== Women's ===
Pole vault (Note: Due to weather conditions athletes only attempted jumps at two heights before the event was cancelled.)
Place	Athlete	Nation	Height	Notes
1st place, gold medalist(s)	Lea Bachmann	Switzerland	4.35 m	
1st place, gold medalist(s)	Hanga Klekner	Hungary	4.35 m	
1st place, gold medalist(s)	Angelica Moser	Switzerland	4.35 m	
4	Olivia McTaggart	New Zealand	4.35 m	
4	Amálie Švábíková	Czech Republic	4.35 m	
6	Marie-Julie Bonnin	France	4.20 m	
6	Gabriela Leon	United States	4.20 m	
6	Tina Šutej	Slovenia	4.20 m	
—	Brynn King	United States	NM	

== See also ==
- 2025 Diamond League
