= Kajsa Roth =

Swedish athlete (born 2006)

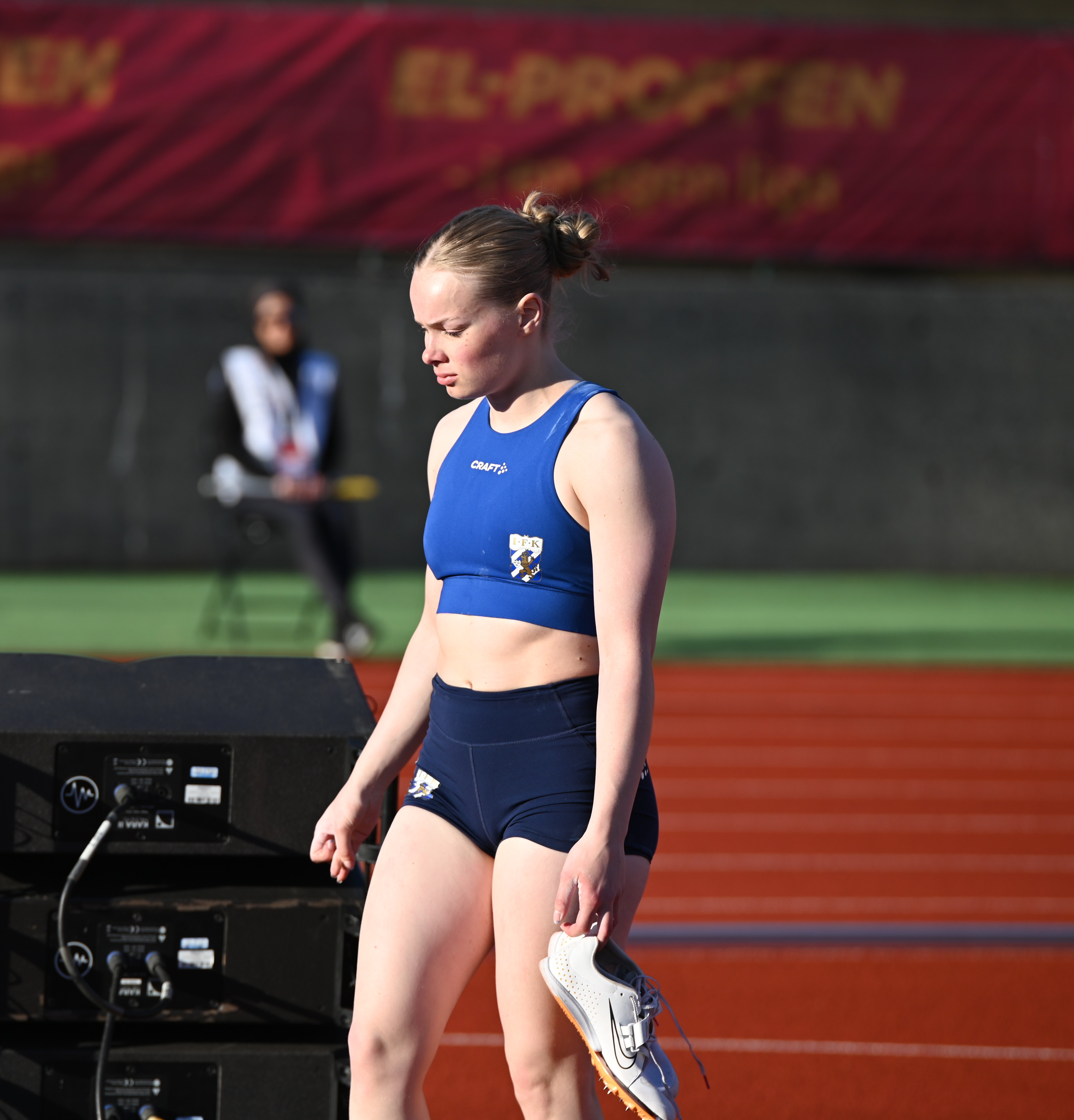
- Kajsa Roth in 2026

Personal information
- Nationality: Swedish
- Born: 7 March 2006 (age 20)

Sport
- Sport: Athletics
- Event: Pole vault
- Club: IFK Göteborg

Achievements and titles
- Personal best: Pole vault: 4.50m (2026)

Kajsa Roth (born 7 March 2006) is a Swedish pole vaulter. She is a multiple-time national champion, having won titles both indoors and outdoors from 2024.

== Biography ==
Roth competed in gymnastics before taking-up athletics at the age of eleven years-old, and quickly developed an aptitude for the pole vault. She trained from an early age as a member of IFK Göteborg. She cleared four metres to qualify for the final of the pole vault at the 2023 European Athletics U20 Championships in Jerusalem, Israel in August 2023, before ultimately placing eighth overall.

Roth set a new personal best of 4.15 metres in early 2024. Shortly afterwards she won the Swedish Indoor Athletics Championships for the first time in February 2024 in Karlstad, with a clearance or 4.12 meters. Unfortunately, she suffered a stress reaction in her shin and was therefore unable to compete during the summer of 2024. She returned to retain her senior national title at the Swedish Indoor Athletics Championships in February 2025 in Växjö.

Roth won the outdoor Swedish Athletics Championships in 2025. She placed third with 4.38 metres competing for Sweden at the Finnkampen tournament in Stockholm, Sweden in August 2025, finishing behind the experienced Finnish pair Elina Lampela and Wilma Murto.

During the 2025 season, Roth increased her personal best to 4.42 metres and was selected to the Swedish team competing at the 2025 World Athletics Championships in Tokyo, Japan, in September 2025. In the championship, she set a new personal best with 4.45 meters, but did not qualify for the final.

Roth cleared 4.40 metres to win the pole vault at the 2026 Swedish Indoor Championships in Stockholm. In August, she was a finalist competing at the 2026 European Athletics Championships in Birmingham, England, placing tenth overall.
