= Lucy Bryan =

English pole vaulter

Personal information
- Born: 22 May 1995 (age 31) Bristol, England, United Kingdom
- Education: University of Akron

Sport
- Sport: Athletics
- Event: Pole vault
- College team: Akron Zips
- Club: Bristol & West
- Coached by: Alan Richardson (2016–); Charles Preston (2011–2015); Neil Winter (–2011)

Lucy Bryan (born 22 May 1995 in Bristol) is an English athlete specialising in pole vault. She won a bronze medal at the 2017 European U23 Championships.

Her personal bests in the event are 4.50 metres outdoors (LSU, 2017) and 4.51 metres indoors (Akron 2018).

== Personal life ==
Lucy is the sister of Millwall's Joe Bryan.

== International competitions ==
| Year | Competition | Venue | Position | Notes |
Representing Great Britain and England
| 2011 | World Youth Championships | Lille, France | 3rd | 4.10 m |
| 2013 | European Junior Championships | Rieti, Italy | 7th | 4.05 m |
| 2017 | European U23 Championships | Bydgoszcz, Poland | 3rd | 4.40 m |
| 2018 | Commonwealth Games | Gold Coast, Australia | 7th | 4.30 m |
| 2018 | European Championships | Berlin, Germany | 15th (q) | 4.35 m |
