= Aksana Gataullina =

Russian pole vaulter (born 2000)

Aksana Gataullina (born 17 July 2000) is a Russian pole vaulter. She competed as an authorised neutral athlete in the pole vault events of 2018 IAAF World U20 Championships, 2018 Russian Athletics Championships and 2019 European Athletics U20 Championship. She is the daughter of Olympic silver medalist Rodion Gataullin.
