= Lisa Gunnarsson =

Swedish pole vaulter

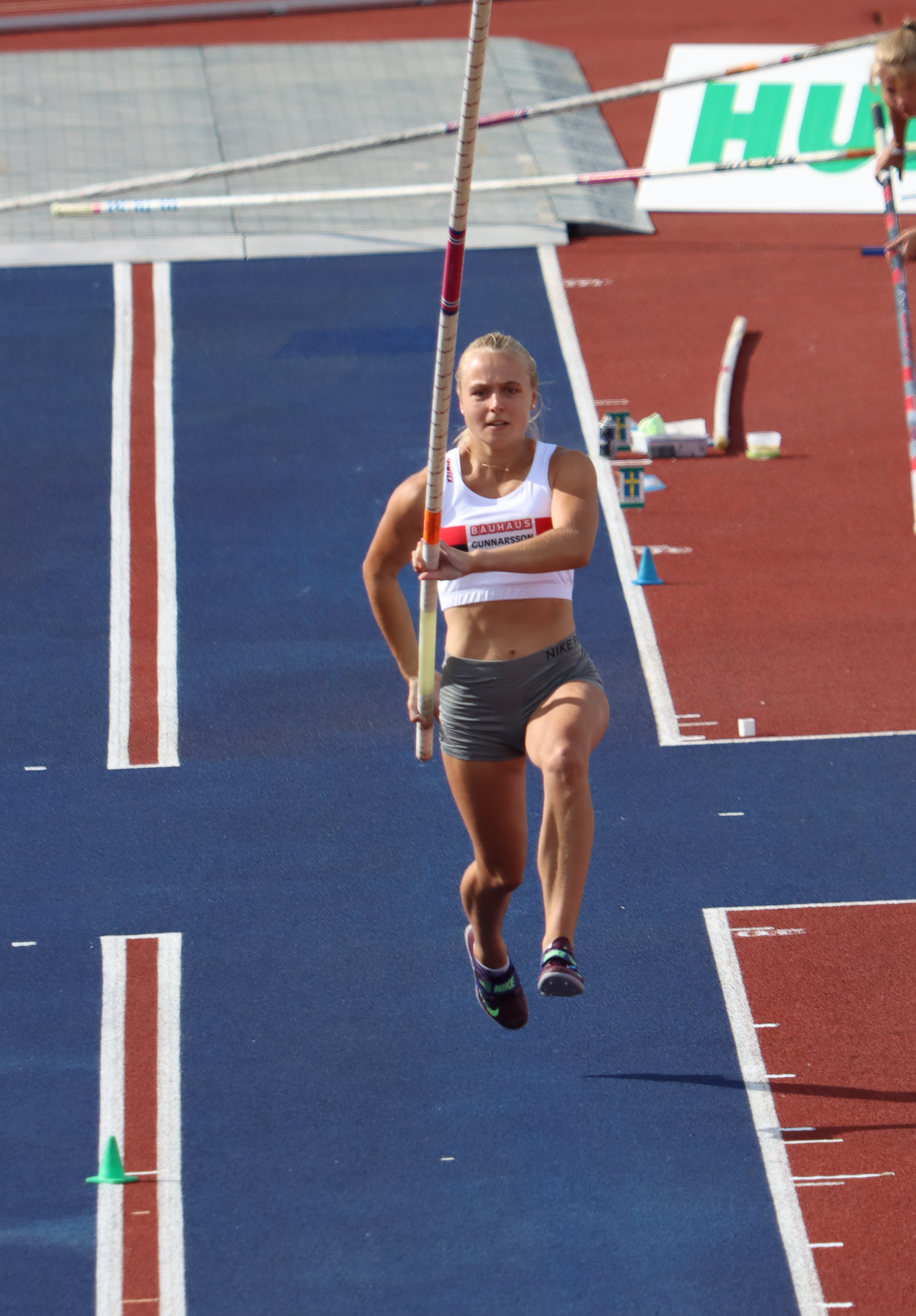
- Lisa Gunnarsson at the 2020 Bauhaus Galan meeting in Stockholm

Personal information
- Full name: Lisa Ulrika Gunnarsson
- Born: 20 August 1999 (age 26) Stockholm, Sweden
- Height: 171 cm (5 ft 7 in)
- Weight: 57 kg (126 lb)

Sport
- Country: Sweden
- Sport: Track and field
- Event: Pole vault
- Club: Louisiana State University (USA); Virginia Tech (USA); Hässelby SK (Sweden); Stade Français (France)
- Coached by: Alain Donias

Achievements and titles
- Personal best(s): outdoor: 4.60 m (2018) indoor: 4.55 m (2017)
Medal record
Women's athletics
Representing Sweden
World U20 Championships
Silver medal – second place	2018 Tampere	Pole vault
European U20 Championships
Gold medal – first place	2017 Grosseto	Pole vault
European U23 Championships
Bronze medal – third place	2021 Tallinn	Pole vault
- Updated on 2019-03-07

Lisa Ulrika Gunnarsson (born 20 August 1999) is a Swedish athlete who specialises in the pole vault. Her personal bests in the event, 4.50 metres outdoors and 4.55 indoors, are both World youth best performances (under 18). Gunnarsson finished sixth at the 2017 European Indoor Championships in Belgrade and has won two French Championship titles.

== Biography ==
Born in Stockholm, Sweden, Gunnarsson has only lived in Sweden for about three years, having spent most of her life abroad due to her father's professional assignments. She has lived in Sweden (twice), Argentina, Luxembourg (twice), France (twice) and since 2018 the United States.

Gunnarsson started out as a very promising gymnast and was a member of the Swedish junior national team. At the time of the Summer Olympics in London she was practicing gymnastics for thirty hours a week. But as she watched her big role model in the sport, Jonna Adlerteg, finish 39th in the games' all-around competition she told her mother, Ulrika: "I'm not training this much just to finish 39th at the Olympics. I want to win gold!" That was when she decided not to invest any more time in gymnastics. In her final competition representing the French club, Angers Gymnastique, Gunnarsson won the individual all-around title in the category "National B 13" at the French National Championships held in Troyes 4–6 May 2012. She scored 13.833 on the vault, 10.633 on the uneven bars, 9.466 on the balance beam and 12.466 on the floor exercise. Her total score for all four events was 46.398 points.

Gunnarsson took up athletics at the age of 12, after she had moved to Paris, France with her parents. She first tried pole vaulting in the spring of 2013 and, despite injuring herself after a fall during her second practice, she decided to give it another try. That turned out to be the right decision. Gunnarsson had a natural talent for pole vaulting and cleared 2.40 metres in her very first competition on 27 April. Just 50 days later she had improved her personal best to 3.42. When asked what she thinks is the key to her rapid improvement in the event, Gunnarsson answered that she is very grateful of her gymnastics background which has provided her with the strength and flexibility required for pole vaulting. Gunnarsson has previously attended a school in Nantes, but in October 2016 she decided to move back to Paris, to be closer to her parents who live there. In 2016, Gunnarsson attended INSEP, a national training institute for elite athletes, where she was coached by Alain Donias. She has competed for the French athletics club Stade Français, as well as the Swedish club Hässelby SK. In 2018, she competed for Virginia Tech as a college freshman. As of 2019, she competes for Louisiana State University.

=== NCAA ===
Year	Competition	Position	Event	Time
Representing Louisiana State University Tigers
2021	NCAA Div 1 Outdoor Track & Field Championships	1st	Pole Vault	4.40 m (14 ft 5 in)
2021	2021 Southeastern Conference Outdoor Track and Field Championships	2nd	Pole Vault	4.49 m (14 ft 8 3/4 in)
2021	NCAA Div 1 Indoor Track & Field Championships	1st	Pole Vault	4.56 m (14 ft 11 1/2 in)
2021	2021 Southeastern Conference Indoor Track and Field Championships	3rd	Pole Vault	4.35 m (14 ft 3 1/4 in)
2020	2020 Southeastern Conference Indoor Track and Field Championships	1st	Pole Vault	4.46 m (14 ft 7 1/2 in)
2019	2019 Southeastern Conference Outdoor Track and Field Championships	6th	Pole Vault	4.16 m (13 ft 7 3/4 in)
Representing Virginia Tech Hokies
2018	NCAA Div 1 Outdoor Track & Field Championships	3rd	Pole Vault	4.40 m (14 ft 5 in)
2018	2018 Atlantic Coast Conference Outdoor Track and Field Championships	2nd	Pole Vault	4.45 m (14 ft 7 in)
2018	NCAA Div 1 Indoor Track & Field Championships	4th	Pole Vault	4.41 m (14 ft 5 1/2 in)
2018	2018 Atlantic Coast Conference Indoor Track and Field Championships	1st	Pole Vault	4.35 m (14 ft 3 1/4 in)

== Competition record ==
Year	Competition	Venue	Position	Notes
2015	European U20 Championships	Eskilstuna, Sweden	5th	4.10 m
2015	European Youth Olympic Festival	Tbilisi, Georgia	2nd	4.15 m
2016	European Championships	Amsterdam, Netherlands	23rd (q)	4.00 m
2016	World U20 Championships	Bydgoszcz, Poland	7th	4.10 m
2017	European Indoor Championships	Belgrade, Serbia	6th	4.55 m
2017	European U20 Championships	Grosseto, Italy	1st	4.40 m
2017	World Championships	London, United Kingdom	17th (q)	4.35 m
2018	World U20 Championships	Tampere, Finland	2nd	4.35 m
2018	European Championships	Berlin, Germany	13th (q)	4.35 m
2021	European U23 Championships	Tallinn, Estonia	3rd	4.40 m
2022	World Championships	Eugene, United States	16th (q)	4.35 m
2022	European Championships	Munich, Germany	24th (q)	4.10 m
