= Silja Andersson =

Finnish athlete

Personal information
- Nationality: Finnish
- Born: 30 November 2003 (age 22)

Sport
- Sport: Athletics
- Event: Pole Vault

Achievements and titles
- Personal best(s): Pole vault: 4.31m (Tampere, 2024)

Silja Andersson (born 30 November 2003) is a Finnish pole vaulter. She became the national indoor champion of Finland in 2024. She is the sister of fellow pole vaulter Saga Andersson.

== Career ==
A member of Espoo Athletics Club, she is also coached by her father Björn Andersson. She set a new personal best of 4.25m in February 2022, that month she finished third at the Finnish Indoor Athletics Championships in Kuopio. She finished third at the Finnish Athletics Championships in June 2022, with a height of 4.20 metres. She placed sixth overall representing Finland at the 2022 World Athletics U20 Championships in Cali, Colombia, with a successful height of 4.10 metres.

She finished third at the Finnish indoor Athletics Championships in February 2023, clearing a height of 4.20 metres to finish behind the winner Elina Lampela and her sister Saga Andersson. She finished sixth at the 2023 European Athletics U20 Championships in Espoo, Finland, clearing a personal best 4.30m in July 2023. That month, she finished fourth at the Finnish Championships in Lahti with 4.20 metres.

She became Finnish national champion at the Finnish Indoor Athletics Championships in February 2024 clearing a personal best height of 4.31 metres. She was selected for the 2024 European Athletics Championships in Rome, Italy, but recorded no successful jumps in her qualifying heat and did not progress to the final. She finished third at the Finnish Championships in June 2024, with a height of 4.05 metres.

She finished third behind Lampela and Saga Andersson at the Finnish Indoor Championships in February 2025.

== Personal life ==
Her sister Saga Andersson is also a pole vaulter.
