= Eleni-Klaoudia Polak =

Greek pole vaulter

Personal information
- Born: 9 September 1996 (age 30) Athens, Greece
- Height: 1.74 m (5 ft 9 in)
- Weight: 61 kg (134 lb)

Sport
- Sport: Athletics
- Event: Pole vault
- Club: AO Megaron
- Coached by: Manolis Karagiannis

Achievements and titles
- Personal bests: 4.70m 4.71m (i)

Eleni-Klaoudia Polak (Greek: Ελένη-Κλαούντια Πόλακ; born 9 September 1996) is a Greek athlete specialising in the pole vault. She represented her country at one outdoor and two indoor European Championships.

== Early life ==
Polak was born in Greece to a Polish father and a Sri Lankan mother.

== Career ==
Her personal bests in the event are 4.70 metres outdoors (Athens 2020) and 4.71 metres indoors (Piraeus 2021).

On 6 August 2024, Polak received a provisional suspension following an adverse analytical finding and retroactively disqualified from the Paris 2024 Olympic Games. In November 2025, she was issued with a four-year ban to expire in August 2028 by the Hellenic National Council for Combating Doping (EOKAN), who disclosed that the prohibited substance was clenbuterol.

== International competitions ==
Year	Competition	Venue	Position	Notes
Representing Greece
2017	European U23 Championships	Bydgoszcz, Poland	11th	4.20 m
2018	Balkan Indoor Championships	Istanbul, Turkey	2nd	4.30 m
2018	Mediterranean U23 Championships	Jesolo, Italy	1st	4.35 m
2018	European Championships	Berlin, Germany	9th (q)	4.45 m^{1}
2019	European Indoor Championships	Glasgow, United Kingdom	12th	4.50 m
2021	European Indoor Championships	Toruń, Poland	5th	4.65 m
2021	Olympic Games	Tokyo, Japan	19th (q)	4.40 m
2022	World Championships	Eugene, United States	22nd (q)	4.35 m
2022	European Championships	Munich, Germany	17th (q)	4.40 m
2023	World Championships	Budapest, Hungary	28th (q)	4.35 m
2024	European Championships	Rome, Italy	16th (q)	4.40 m
2024	Olympic Games	Paris, France	DQ	~~4.20 m~~

^{1} No mark in the final
2 On 6 August 2024 Polak was provisionally suspended due to an Adverse Analytical Finding receiving a DQ according to anti-doping Rule 10.1.
