= Gabriela Leon =

American athlete

Personal information
- Nationality: American
- Born: 17 June 1999 (age 27)

Sport
- Sport: Athletics
- Event: Pole vault

Achievements and titles
- Personal bests: Pole Vault: 4.70m (Albuquerque, 2024)

Gabriela Leon (born 17 June 1999) is an American track and field athlete who competes in the pole vault.

== Early life ==
From Grand Rapids, Michigan, she attended East Kentwood High School.

== Career ==
A student at the University of Louisville, she won the NCAA outdoors pole vault title in June 2022. It was the first outdoor track and field title in the school's history.

She finished fourth at the US national trials in June, 2022 and was selected to compete at the 2022 World Athletics Championships in Eugene, Oregon. On her major championship debut she qualified for the final, where she finished twelfth.

She was selected for the 2025 World Athletics Indoor Championships in Nanjing in March 2025, where she finished in joint-fifth place. She finished seventh in May 2025 at the 2025 Doha Diamond League. The following week she cleared 4.63 metres to place third at the 2025 Meeting International Mohammed VI d'Athlétisme de Rabat, part of the 2025 Diamond League. She finished third with a clearance of 4.65 metres at the Diamond League event at the 2025 Golden Gala in Rome on 6 June 2025 and the following week, she finished joint-fourth in Stockholm at the 2025 BAUHAUS-galan event.

Leon competed in the pole vault at the 2026 USA Indoor Track and Field Championships in New York, placing fourth overall. Leon placed second at the Paavo Nurmi Games in Finland on 3 June and placed sixth on 28 June at the 2026 Meeting de Paris. In July, Leon cleared 4.70 metres to place third at the 2026 Prefontaine Classic.
