= 2024 World Athletics Indoor Championships – Women's pole vault =

Women's pole vault at the 2024 World Athletics Indoor Championships
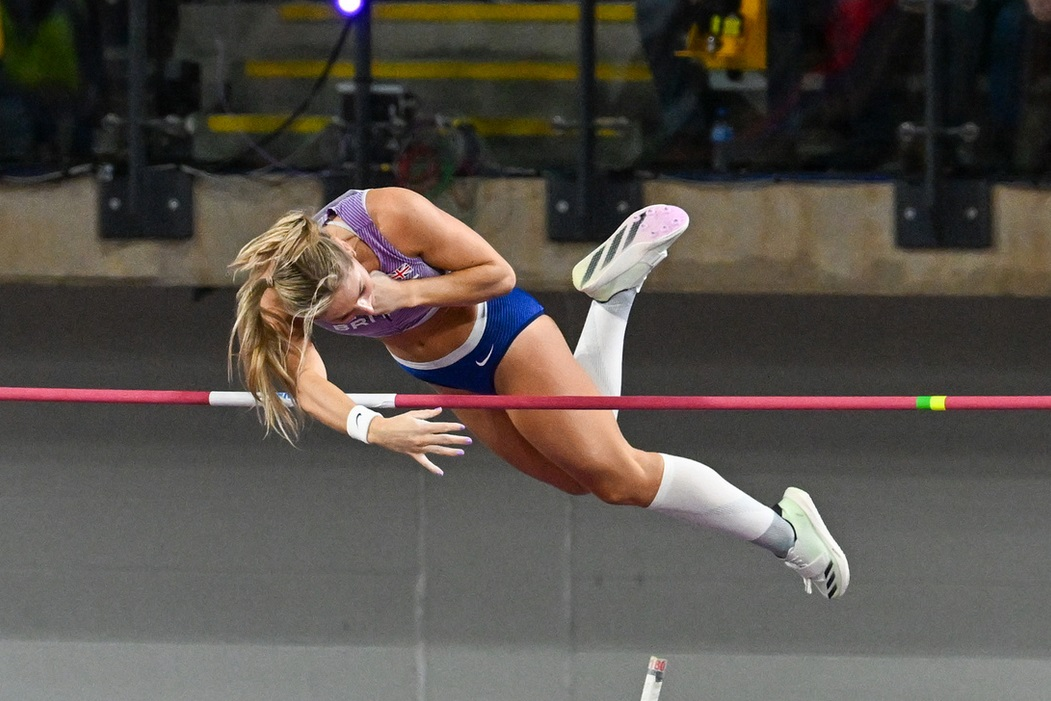
- Molly Caudery in the competition
- Venue: Commonwealth Arena
- Dates: 1–3 March
- Competitors: 12 from 11 nations
- Winning height: 4.80 m

Medalists
| gold medal | Molly Caudery | Great Britain |
| silver medal | Eliza McCartney | New Zealand |
| bronze medal | Katie Moon | United States |

The women's pole vault at the 2024 World Athletics Indoor Championships took place on 2 March 2024.

== Results ==
The final was started at 19:05. The final was halted for approximately thirty minutes in the third round after a serious ankle injury to Margot Chevrier to allow for medical treatment.

| Rank | Athlete | Nationality | 4.40 | 4.55 | 4.65 | 4.75 | 4.80 | 4.85 | 4.90 | Result | Notes |
|---|---|---|---|---|---|---|---|---|---|---|---|
| 1st place, gold medalist(s) | Molly Caudery | Great Britain | – | o | o | xo | xo | xxx | | 4.80 | |
| 2nd place, silver medalist(s) | Eliza McCartney | New Zealand | – | o | xo | o | xxo | x– | xx | 4.80 | |
| 3rd place, bronze medalist(s) | Katie Moon | United States | – | o | – | xo | xxx | | | 4.75 | |
| 4 | Angelica Moser | Switzerland | o | xo | o | xxo | xxx | | | 4.75 | PB |
| 5 | Sandi Morris | United States | – | o | o | xxx | | | | 4.65 | |
| 6 | Amálie Švábíková | Czech Republic | o | o | xxo | xxx | | | | 4.65 | SB |
| 7 | Katerina Stefanidi | Greece | o | o | xxx | | | | | 4.55 | |
| 8 | Margot Chevrier | France | – | xxo | xr | | | | | 4.55 | |
| 9 | Wilma Murto | Finland | – | xxo | r | | | | | 4.55 | |
| 10 | Roberta Bruni | Italy | o | xxx | | | | | | 4.40 | |
| 11 | Li Ling | China | xo | xxx | | | | | | 4.40 | |
| | Alysha Newman | Canada | | | | | | | | DNS | |
