= Margot Chevrier =

French pole-vaulter

Personal information
- Born: 21 December 1999 (age 26) Nice, France
- Height: 173 cm (5 ft 8 in)
- Weight: 57 kg (126 lb)

Sport
- Country: France
- Sport: Athletics
- Event: Pole Vault

Achievements and titles
- Personal bests: Pole Vault: 4.71m (Paris, 2023)

Margot Chevrier (French: [maʁɡo ʃəvʁije]; born 21 December 1999) is a French track and field athlete who competes in the pole vault. She is a multiple French national champion, indoors and outdoors.

== Early and personal life ==
From Nice, Chevrier started athletics in 2012 and combines her training with medical studies.

== Career ==
She won the French Athletics Championships in the pole vault in June 2021 with a jump of 4.51 metres in Angers. She won the national indoor title at the French Athletics Indoor Championships in the pole vault in Miramas in February 2022 with a best height of 4.65 metres. In June 2022 Chevrier claimed her third consecutive French national pole vault title at the French Athletics Championships.

Chevrier reached the final of the Women's pole vault at the 2022 World Athletics Championships held in Eugene, Oregon in July 2022, but did not register a height in the final. Competing in the Women's pole vault at the 2022 European Athletics Championships in Munich in August 2022, Chevrier finished tenth overall.

In February 2023 she claimed her fourth consecutive national pole vault title, 2 indoors and 2 outdoors.

She set a new personal best height of 4.71m to finish second at the Paris Diamond League event on 9 June 2023. She competed at the 2023 World Athletics Championships in Budapest.

She finished in eighth place at the 2024 World Athletics Indoor Championships in Glasgow. During the event she suffered a broken ankle which halted the competition for 15 minutes while she received medical treatment and was stretchered from the arena.

She competed in the 2025 Diamond League event at the 2025 Meeting de Paris in June 2025.

On 25 July 2026, Chevrier cleared 4.55 metres to finish runner-up to Marie-Julie Bonnin at the French Championships in Albi. In August 2026, she competed at the 2026 European Athletics Championships in Birmingham, England, placing joint-fourth overall.
