= Pascale Stöcklin =

Swiss athlete (born 1997)

Pascale Stöcklin OLY
Personal information
- Nationality: Swiss
- Born: 5 February 1997 (age 29)

Sport
- Sport: Athletics
- Event: Pole vault

Achievements and titles
- Personal best: Pole vault: 4.60m (2024)

Pascale Stöcklin OLY (born 5 February 1997) is a Swiss pole vaulter. She has represented Switzerland at multiple major championships, including the 2024 Olympic Games.

== Career ==
She won her first senior medal with a silver in the pole vault at the 2017 Swiss Indoor Championships behind Angelica Moser in February 2017. She won gold at the Athletics at the 2017 Jeux de la Francophonie in Abidjan.

She competed at the 2022 European Athletics Championships in Munich in the pole vault.

In June 2024, she increased her personal best to 4.50 metres. She competed at the 2024 European Championships in Rome, where she qualified for the final and finished in twelfth place overall. She subsequently competed in the pole vault at the 2024 Paris Olympics.

She competed at the 2025 World Athletics Championships in Tokyo, Japan, in September 2025, without advancing to the final.

== Personal life ==
She is from the canton of Basel-Stadt and her home club is the LAS Old Boys Basel. She studies medicine at the University of Basel.
