= Amálie Švábíková =

Czech pole vaulter

Personal information
- Born: 22 November 1999 (age 26) Kadaň, Czech Republic
- Height: 1.81 m (5 ft 11 in)

Sport
- Country: Czech Republic
- Sport: Athletics
- Event: Pole vault
- Club: Univerzitní sportovní klub Praha
- Coached by: Jiřina Kudličková

Achievements and titles
- Personal bests: 4.80 m NR (Paris 2024); 4.51 m NU20R (Tampere 2018); Indoors; 4.72 mi NR (Ostrava 2023)
Medal record
Women's athletics
Representing Czech Republic
World Indoor Championships
| Bronze medal – third place | 2026 Toruń | Pole vault |
European Indoor Championships
| Bronze medal – third place | 2023 Istanbul | Pole vault |
European U23 Championships
| Gold medal – first place | 2021 Tallinn | Pole vault |
| Silver medal – second place | 2019 Gävle | Pole vault |
World U20 Championships
| Gold medal – first place | 2018 Tampere | Pole vault |
European U18 Championships
| Bronze medal – third place | 2016 Tbilisi | Pole vault |
European Youth Olympic Festival
| Bronze medal – third place | 2015 Tbilisi | Pole vault |

Amálie Švábíková (born 22 November 1999) is a Czech pole vaulter. She won the bronze medal at the 2023 European Indoor Championships. Švábíková claimed silver and gold at the 2019 and 2021 European Under-23 Championships respectively.

She was the 2016 European U18 bronze medallist to take gold at the World U20 Championships two years later. Švábíková is the Czech indoor record holder for the pole vault and won six national titles.

She competed in the women's pole vault at the 2017 and 2022 World Athletics Championships, and at the 2022 World Athletics Indoor Championships.

At the 2024 Summer Olympics Švábíková finished fifth, set a new Czech outdoor record with a height of 4.80 m, supprassing previous record Jiřina Ptáčníková's 4.76 m from 2013.

== Achievements ==
=== Personal bests ===
- Pole vault - 4.80 m (15 ft 8 3/4 in) (Paris Olympics 2024) NR
- Pole vault – 4.60 m (15 ft 1 in) (Ostrava 2022)
- Pole vault U20 – 4.51 m (14 ft 9 1/2 in) (Tampere 2018) NU20R
  - Pole vault indoor – 4.72 m (15 ft 5 3/4 in) (Ostrava 2023) NR

=== International competitions ===
Representing Czech Republic
| Year | Competition | Venue | Position | Event | Result |
|---|---|---|---|---|---|
| 2015 | European Youth Olympic Festival | Tbilisi, Georgia | 3rd | Pole vault | 3.90 |
| 2016 | European U18 Championships | Tbilisi, Georgia | 3rd | Pole vault | 4.05 |
| 2016 | World U20 Championships | Bydgoszcz, Poland | 7th | Pole vault | 4.10 |
| 2017 | European U20 Championships | Grosseto, Italy | 5th | Pole vault | 4.05 |
| 2017 | World Championships | London, United Kingdom | – (q) | Pole vault | NH |
| 2018 | World U20 Championships | Tampere, Finland | 1st | Pole vault | 4.51 NU20R |
| 2018 | European Championships | Berlin, Germany | 9th | Pole vault | 4.30 |
| 2019 | European Indoor Championships | Glasgow, United Kingdom | 16th (q) | Pole vault | 4.40 |
| 2019 | European U23 Championships | Gävle, Sweden | 2nd | Pole vault | 4.35 |
| 2021 | European U23 Championships | Tallinn, Estonia | 1st | Pole vault | 4.50 SB |
| 2022 | World Indoor Championships | Belgrade, Serbia | 9th | Pole vault | 4.45 |
| 2022 | World Championships | Eugene, United States | 26th (q) | Pole vault | 4.20 |
| 2022 | European Championships | Munich, Germany | 14th (q) | Pole vault | 4.40 |
| 2023 | European Indoor Championships | Istanbul, Turkey | 3rd | Pole vault | 4.70 |
| 2023 | World Championships | Budapest, Hungary | 11th | Pole vault | 4.50 |
| 2024 | World Indoor Championships | Glasgow, United Kingdom | 6th | Pole vault | 4.65 |
| 2024 | European Championships | Rome, Italy | 4th | Pole vault | 4.58 |
| 2024 | Olympic Games | Paris, France | 5th | Pole vault | 4.80 NR |
| 2025 | European Indoor Championships | Apeldoorn, Netherlands | 6th | Pole vault | 4.65 |
| 2025 | World Indoor Championships | Nanjing, China | 5th | Pole vault | 4.60 |
| 2025 | World Championships | Tokyo, Japan | 4th | Pole vault | 4.75 |
| 2026 | World Indoor Championships | Toruń, Poland | 3rd | Pole vault | 4.70 |

=== National titles ===
- Czech Athletics Championships
  - Pole vault: 2018, 2020, 2022
- Czech Indoor Athletics Championships
  - Pole vault: 2021, 2022, 2023

== Personal life ==
On 21 July 2026, Švábíková with her partner Ondřej Kopecký announced her pregnancy in a post on Instagram.
