= Hanga Klekner =

Hungarian athlete (born 1999)

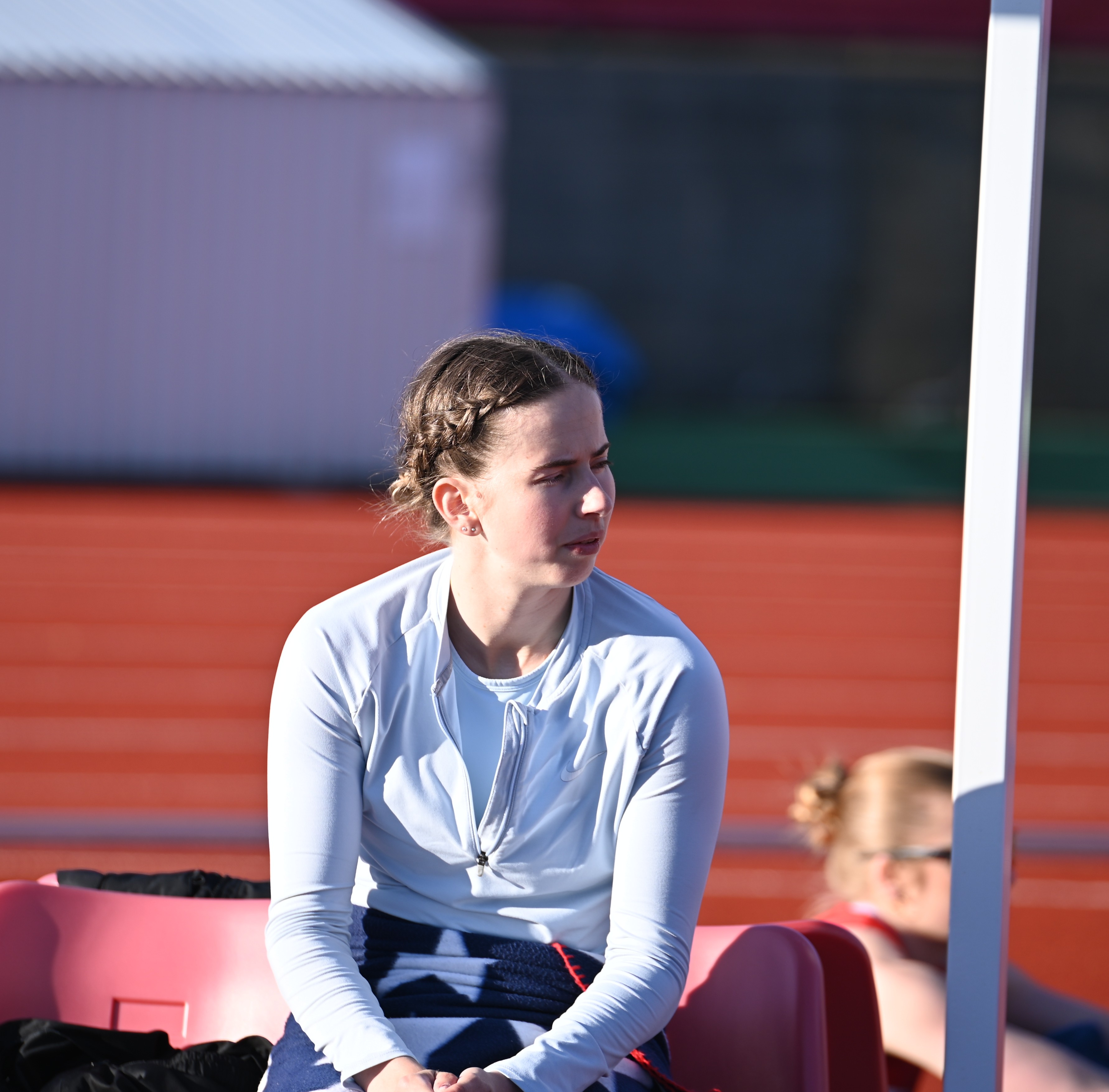
- Hanga Klekner in 2026

Personal information
- Nationality: Hungarian
- Born: 24 September 1999 (age 26)

Sport
- Sport: Athletics
- Event: Pole vault

Achievements and titles
- Personal bests: Pole vault: 4.60 m (2025) NR

Hanga Klekner (born 24 September 1999) is a Hungarian pole vaulter. She is the Hungarian national record holder and has represented the country at multiple major championships, including the 2023 World Athletics Championships and the 2024 Olympic Games.

== Biography ==
She became national champion for the first time at the 2020 Hungarian Athletics Championships. She retained her national title in 2021. She finished in fifth place at the 2021 European Athletics U23 Championships in the pole vault in Tallinn, Estonia.

She won her third consecutive national pole vault title at the Hungarian Athletics Championships in June 2022. She competed at the 2022 European Athletics Championships in Munich, Germany in the pole vault.

She won the Hungarian Indoor Athletics Championships pole vault title in February 2023. She competed at the 2023 European Athletics Indoor Championships in Istanbul, Turkey, in the women's pole vault. She competed at the 2023 World Athletics Championships in Budapest, clearing 4.50 metres for the first time.

She competed at the 2024 European Championships in Rome, Italy. She set a new national record at the 2024 Hungarian Athletics Championships, clearing 4.57 metres. She competed at the 2024 Olympic Games in Paris, France.

She won the Hungarian Indoor Athletics Championships pole vault title in February 2025 in Nyíregyháza. She competed at the 2025 European Athletics Indoor Championships in Apeldoorn, Netherlands, but did not progress to the final. Having competed at the 2025 European Athletics Team Championships in Madrid in June 2025 in the pole vault she also stepped-up after a crisis in personnel at the event for her country, running the 800 metres to score a point in the team competition. With Angelica Moser, and Lea Bachmann she shared the win with 4.35 metres at the 2025 Athletissima in wet conditions in Lausanne. She set a new personal best of 4.60 metres to win the 2025 Hungarian Championships in Budapest. She competed at the 2025 World Athletics Championships in Tokyo, Japan, in September 2025, without advancing to the final.

Klekner made a strong start to her 2026 indoor season with a win at the BAUHAUS-Galan Indoor, a World Athletics Indoor Tour Silver meeting, winning the pole vault with a 4.52m clearance. Klekner cleared 4.45 metres to win the pole vault title at the 2026 Hungarian Indoor Championships in Nyíregyháza. In August, she was a finalist competing at the 2026 European Athletics Championships in Birmingham, England, placing joint-seventh overall.

== Personal life ==
She is from Debrecen in the Northern Great Plain of Hungary.
