= Ariadni Adamopoulou =

Greek pole vaulter

- Adamopoulou in 2026

Personal information
- Born: 19 December 2000 (age 25) Athens, Greece
- Height: 1.72
- Weight: 58

Sport
- Sport: Athletics
- Event: Pole vault
- Club: G.S. Kifissia
- Coached by: Vassilis Megaloikonomou

Achievements and titles
- Personal bests: 4.50m (2024); 4.52m (i) (2026)

Ariadni Adamopoulou (Greek: Αριάδνη Αδαμοπούλου; born 19 December 2000) is a Greek pole vaulter. Adamopoulou won twice the Greek Indoor Championships (in 2016 -at the age of 15- and in 2024). She represented Greece at the 2024 Olympic Games in Paris.

Adamopoulou competed for the Oklahoma State Cowgirls track and field team in the NCAA.

Her personal best in the event is 4.52 metres (2026).

== International competitions ==
Year	Competition	Venue	Position	Notes
Representing Greece
2024	European Championships	Rome, Italy	20th (q)	4.40 m
2024	Olympic Games	Paris, France	12th (q)	4.40 m^{1}
2025	European Indoor Championships	Apeldoorn, Netherlands	12th (q)	4.45 m SB
2025	World Championships	Tokyo, Japan	24th (q)	4.25 m
2026	Balkan Championships	Volos, Greece	2nd	4.48 m =CR
2026	European Championships	Birmingham, United Kingdom	11th	4.30 m
2026	Mediterranean Games	Taranto, Italy	7th	4.05 m

^{1} Did not start in the final
