= Lea Bachmann =

Swiss athlete (born 1996)

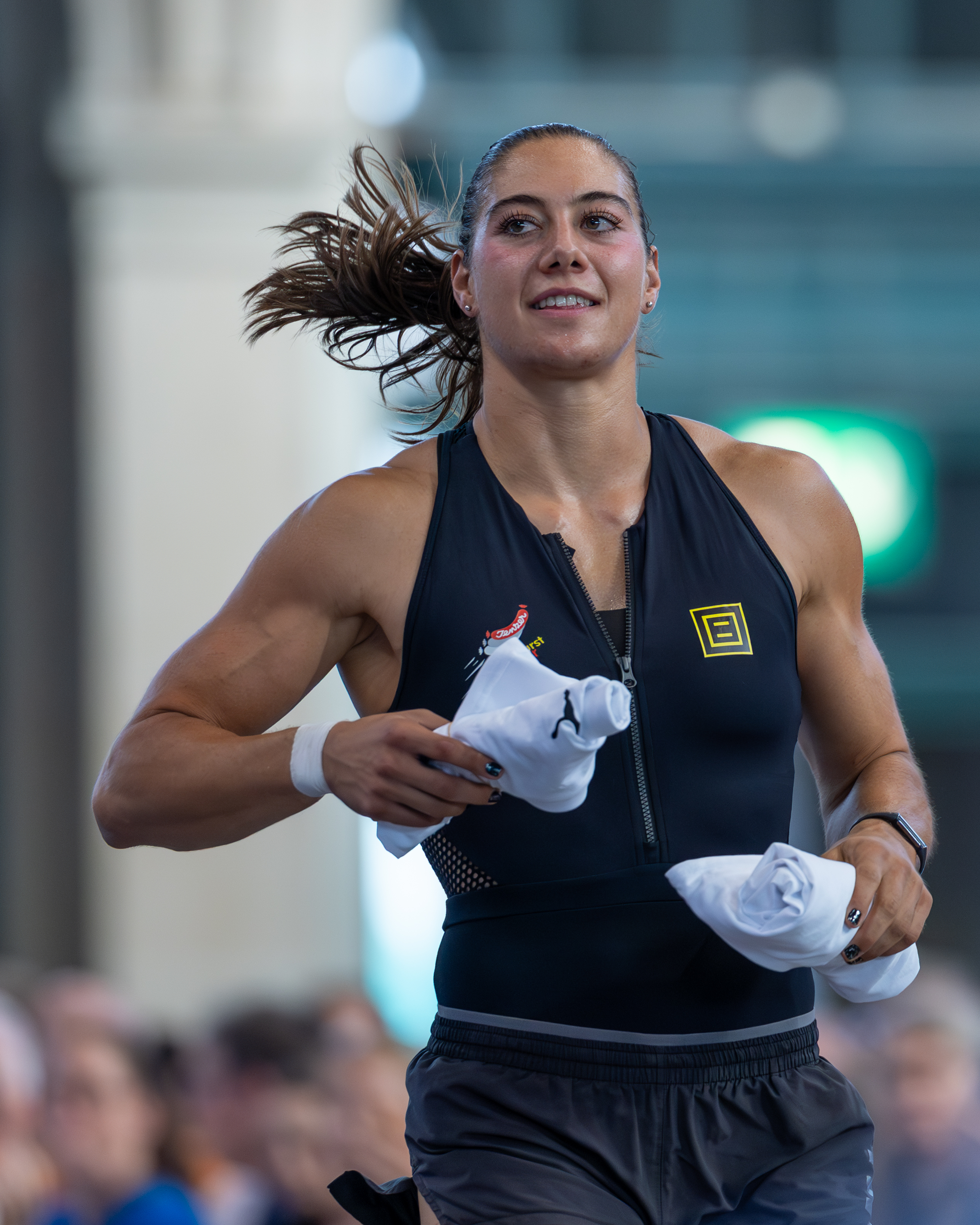
- Lea Bachmann in the Pole Vault at the 2026 Wanda Diamond League’s Weltklasse Zürich athletics competition.

Personal information
- Nationality: Swiss
- Born: 25 June 1996 (age 30)

Sport
- Sport: Athletics
- Event: Pole vault

Achievements and titles
- Personal bests: Pole vault: 4.58m (Düsseldorf, 2025)

Lea Bachmann (born 25 June 1996) is a Swiss pole vaulter. She represented Switzerland at the 2025 World Athletics Championships.

== Early and personal life ==
From Basel, she completed a master's degree in law before pursuing a doctorate at the University of Basel. She is also keen swimmer and skier outside of athletics.

== Career ==
She has a long-term coaching arrangement with Anatoly Gordienko. Whilst competing in June 2018 for Goldwurstpower she set a new personal best and Basel-Stadt Canton record of 4.30 metres. She competed at the 2019 Summer Universiade in Napoli but her poles arrived late and she had to compete using implements borrowed from a Danish competitor but she qualified for the final and placed ninth overall.

She is a member of LAS Old Boys Basel. She cleared 4.35 metres to place second overall at the 2024 Swiss Indoor Athletics Championships in February 2024.

She competed at the 2024 European Athletics Championships in Rome, Italy in June 2024 where she cleared a height of 4.40 metres but did not qualify for the final. That month, she set a personal best of 4.50 metres for the pole vault whilst competing at the 2024 Swiss Athletics Championships in Winterthur, placing third overall.

The following year, after missing the indoor season due to foot surgery, she won the spring meeting at Schützenmatte with a jump of 4.40 metres in May 2025.

In August 2025, Bachmann jumped 4.58 m for a new personal best whilst competing in Düsseldorf, Germany. That month, she secured a win at the international "Sky's the Limit" meet in Zweibrücken, Germany, with a clearance of 4.45 m. With Angelica Moser, and Hanga Klekner she shared the win with 4.35 metres at the 2025 Athletissima in wet conditions in Lausanne on 20 August. She placed seventh at the Diamond League Final in Zurich on 28 August. She competed at the 2025 World Athletics Championships in Tokyo, Japan, in September 2025, without advancing to the final.

In August 2026, she competed at the 2026 European Athletics Championships in Birmingham, England.
