= Marleen Mülla =

Swedish athlete (born 2006)

Personal information
- Nationality: Estonian
- Born: 28 June 2001 (age 25) Rakvere, Estonia

Sport
- Sport: Athletics
- Event: Pole vault

Achievements and titles
- Personal bests: Pole vault: 4.63 m (2026) NR

Marleen Mülla (born 28 June 2001) is an Estonian pole vaulter. She is the national record holder and represented Estonia at the 2025 World Championships.

== Biography ==
From Rakvere and a member of Rakvere Athletics Club ViKe, she jumped over four metres for the first time in February 2019 in Tallinn, at the age of 17 years-old, having worked with the coach Hennit Küppas. In doing so, she became the sixth Estonian female athlete to achieve the height. Having become Estonian national champion, she set a new personal best of 4.07 metres competing in January 2020.

Mülla competed for the South Dakota Coyotes track and field team in the NCAA. In January 2022, she set an Estonian domestic record with a clearness of 4.33 metres. In February 2022, she set a new national record of 4.40 metres whilst competing in Grand Forks, and broke it again in April 2022, clearing 4.41 metres in South Dakota.

In January 2023, Mülla cleared a height of 4.43 m to improve the national record and just a week later, cleared a height of 4.47 and then shortly afterwards set the Estonian national record at 4.52, before clearing 4.55 metres in February, improving the Estonian indoor national record four times in a few weeks. She placed third at the 2023 NCAA Indoor Championships.

She had best clearance competing indoors in 2024 of 4.45 metres. She made her senior major championships debut at the 2024 European Athletics Championships in Rome, Italy, in June 2024. She cleared 4.40 metres and did not advance to the final, placing sixteenth overall.

In May 2025, she set a new national record of 4.57 metres whilst competing in Vermillion, South Dakota. The following month she competed in Maribor, Slovenia representing Estonia at the 2025 European Athletics Team Championships Second Division. She competed at the 2025 World Athletics Championships in Tokyo, Japan, in September 2025, without advancing to the final.

Mülla set a new personal best of 4.63 metres in 2026, and cleared 4.61 m to finish second at the 2026 NCAA Division I Indoor Track and Field Championships. She was selected for the 2026 World Athletics Indoor Championships in Toruń, Poland, in March 2026. In June, Mülla also qualified for the 2026 NCAA Outdoor Championships. In August, she was a finalist competing at the 2026 European Athletics Championships in Birmingham, England, placing joint-seventh overall.
