= Molly Caudery =

British pole vaulter (born 2000)

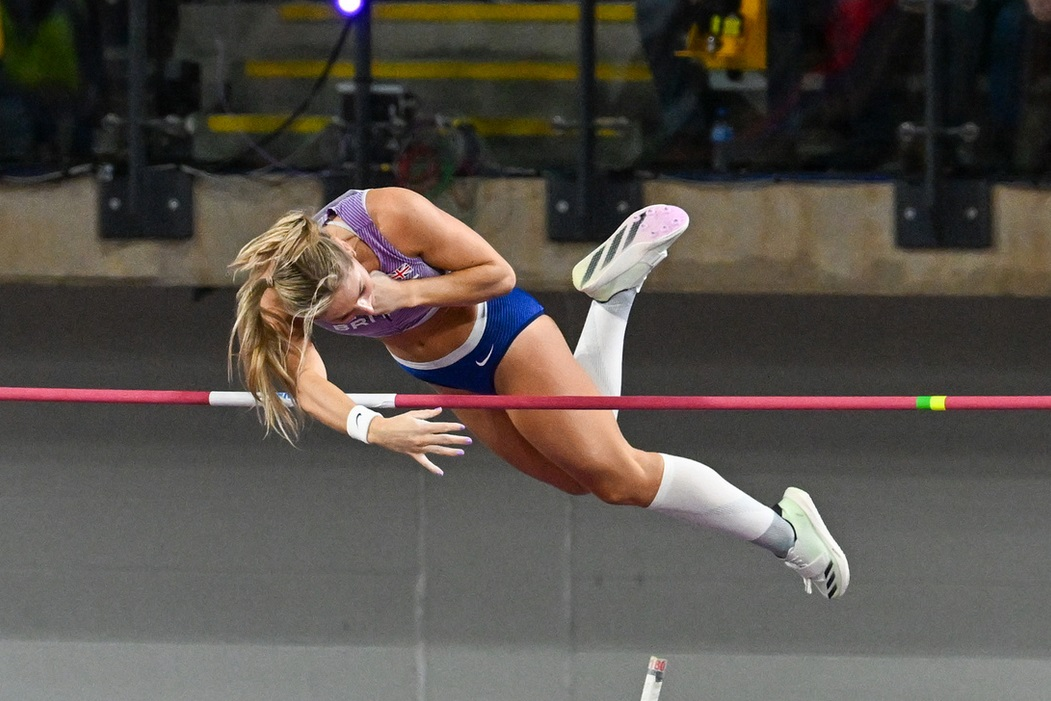
- Molly Caudery in Glasgow, 2024

Personal information
- Nationality: British (English)
- Born: 17 March 2000 (age 26) Truro, Cornwall, England
- Height: 175 cm (5 ft 9 in)

Sport
- Sport: Athletics
- Event: Pole vault
- Club: Thames Valley Harriers

Achievements and titles
- Personal bests: 4.92 m (2024) NR
Medal record
Women's athletics
Representing Great Britain
World indoor Championships
Gold medal – first place	2024 Glasgow	Pole vault
Gold medal – first place	2026 Toruń	Pole vault
European Championships
Bronze medal – third place	2024 Rome	Pole vault
European U20 Championships
Silver medal – second place	2017 Grosseto	Pole vault
European U23 Championships
Silver medal – second place	2021 Tallinn	Pole vault
Representing England
Commonwealth Games
Silver medal – second place	2022 Birmingham	Pole vault

Molly Caudery (born 17 March 2000) is a British athlete who competes in the pole vault event for England and Great Britain. Caudery is the 2024 and 2026 World Indoor champion. She was also a silver medalist at the 2022 Commonwealth Games and took bronze at the 2024 European Athletics Championships.

Caudery holds the British national record for the women's pole vault, with a best of 4.92 m.

== Athletics career ==
In 2017, Caudery won the silver medal at the 2017 European Athletics U20 Championships in Grosseto, Italy.

On 17 February 2018, she won her first senior title, indoors, at the age of seventeen. She was selected to compete for England at the 2018 Commonwealth Games on the Gold Coast, Queensland, Australia where she finished fifth. She was England's youngest athlete at the games. On 23 June 2018, she set a new British junior pole vault record of 4.53 m.

Caudery won a silver medal at the 2021 European Athletics U23 Championships in Tallinn, Estonia, and repeated that result representing England at the 2022 Commonwealth Games in Birmingham.

In 2023, she became the British pole vault champion after winning the 2023 British Championships, with a personal best of 4.71 m which qualified her for the 2023 World Athletics Championships in Budapest, Hungary, where she finished fifth in the final raising her personal to 4.75 m.

In 2024, Caudery set a new personal best of 4.83 m at Meeting de l’Eure on 28 January. She raised that mark to 4.85 m in taking first place at the 2024 British Athletics Indoor Championships on 17 February before clearing 4.86 m one week later at a meeting in Rouen, France.

On 2 March 2024, she won the gold medal at the 2024 World Athletics Indoor Championships in Glasgow with a jump of 4.80 m. She was Great Britain's first world champion in the event.

Caudery continued her good form into the outdoor season winning her first Diamond League event in Doha, Qatar, on 10 May 2024 with a best height of 4.73 m. She subsequently took gold at the Golden Spike Ostrava on the 2024 World Athletics Continental Tour on 28 May, clearing 4.84 m, the highest successful vault of 2024 so far.

Caudery won bronze at the 2024 European Athletics Championships in Rome, Italy, on 10 June 2024, clearing 4.73 m which was 5cms behind champion Angelica Moser.

She set a new British record with a world-leading vault of 4.92 m at the Toulouse Capitole Perche meet in France on 22 June 2024.

A week later Caudery won the British outdoor title with a jump of 4.83 m to confirm her place at the 2024 Summer Olympics. At the Games in Paris she did not qualify for the final after failing three times at her opening height of 4.55m.

In February 2025, Caudery won the World Athletics Indoor Tour Gold title by taking two first places and a second across competition. The following month she finished fourth at the 2025 World Athletics Indoor Championships in China.

She won the Doha Diamond League on 16 May 2025, with a jump of 4.75 m. Caudery then won a third consecutive British outdoor title at the 2025 UK Athletics Championships.

At the 2025 World Athletics Championships in Tokyo, Japan, she injured her ankle during the warm-up before the qualifying competition and withdrew.

On 22 March 2026, at the 2026 World Athletics Indoor Championships in Poland, Caudery won the world indoor pole-vault title after successfully jumping 4.85 m.

Caudery won the Diamond League Golden Gala in Rome on 4 June 2026, jumping 4.80 m. Nine days later, on 13 June 2026, she announced she had undergone emergency spinal surgery to remove part of a spinal disc and consequently would miss the rest of the season.

== International competitions ==
- All information from World Athletics profile

Representing Great Britain & England
Year	Competition	Venue	Position	Result	Notes
2017	European Junior Championships	Grosseto, Italy	2nd	4.35 m	
2018	Commonwealth Games	Gold Coast, Australia	5th	4.40 m	England
2018	World U20 Championships	Tampere, Finland	9th	4.10 m	
2021	European U20 Championships	Tallinn, Estonia	2nd	4.45 m	
2021	European Team Championships	Chorzów, Poland	3rd	4.35 m	
2022	Commonwealth Games	Birmingham, United Kingdom	2nd	4.45 m	England
2022	European Championships	Berlin, Germany	7th	4.55 m	
2023	World Championships	Budapest, Hungary	5th	4.75 m	
2024	World Indoor Championships	Glasgow, United Kingdom	1st	4.80 m	
2024	European Championships	Rome, Italy	3rd	4.73 m	
2024	Olympic Games	Paris, France	–	NM	
2025	World Indoor Championships	Nanjing, China	4th	4.70 m	
2026	World Indoor Championships	Torun, Poland	1st	4.85 m	

== National titles ==
- British Indoor Athletics Championships
  - 2018, 2024
- British Athletics Championships
  - 2023, 2024

== Season's bests ==
- All information from World Athletics profile

Year	Outdoor best	Indoor best
2015	3.80	3.91
2016	4.06	3.93
2017	4.35	4.10
2018	4.53	4.30
2019	4.08	4.18
2020	4.15	4.05
2021	4.51	4.30
2022	4.60	—
2023	4.75	—
2024	4.92 NR	4.85
2025	4.85	4.85
2026	4.80	4.80

== See also ==
- List of European Athletics Championships medalists (women)
- List of Commonwealth Games medallists in athletics (women)
- List of World Athletics Indoor Championships medalists (women)
- List of British champions in pole vault
