= Anjuli Knäsche =

German pole vaulter

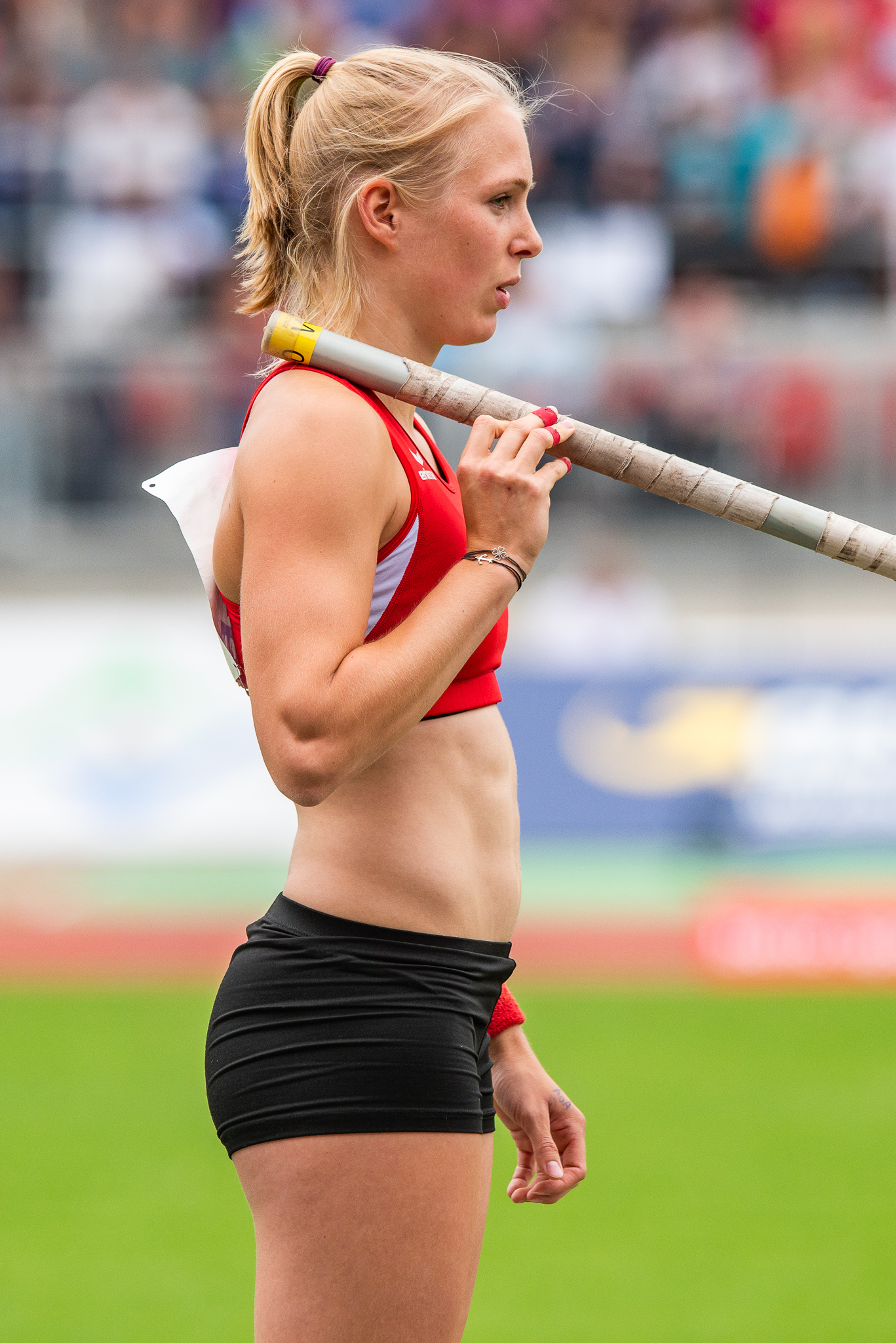

Personal information
- Born: 18 October 1993 (age 32) Preetz, Germany
- Height: 1.69 m (5 ft 7 in)

Sport
- Country: Germany
- Sport: Track and field
- Event: Pole vault
- Club: VfB Stuttgart

Anjuli Knäsche (born 18 October 1993) is a German athlete who competes in pole vault events in international track and field competitions. Her highest achievement is tied fourth place with Kira Grünberg at the 2012 World Junior Championships in Athletics in Barcelona.
