= Lene Retzius =

Norwegian pole vaulter (born 1996)

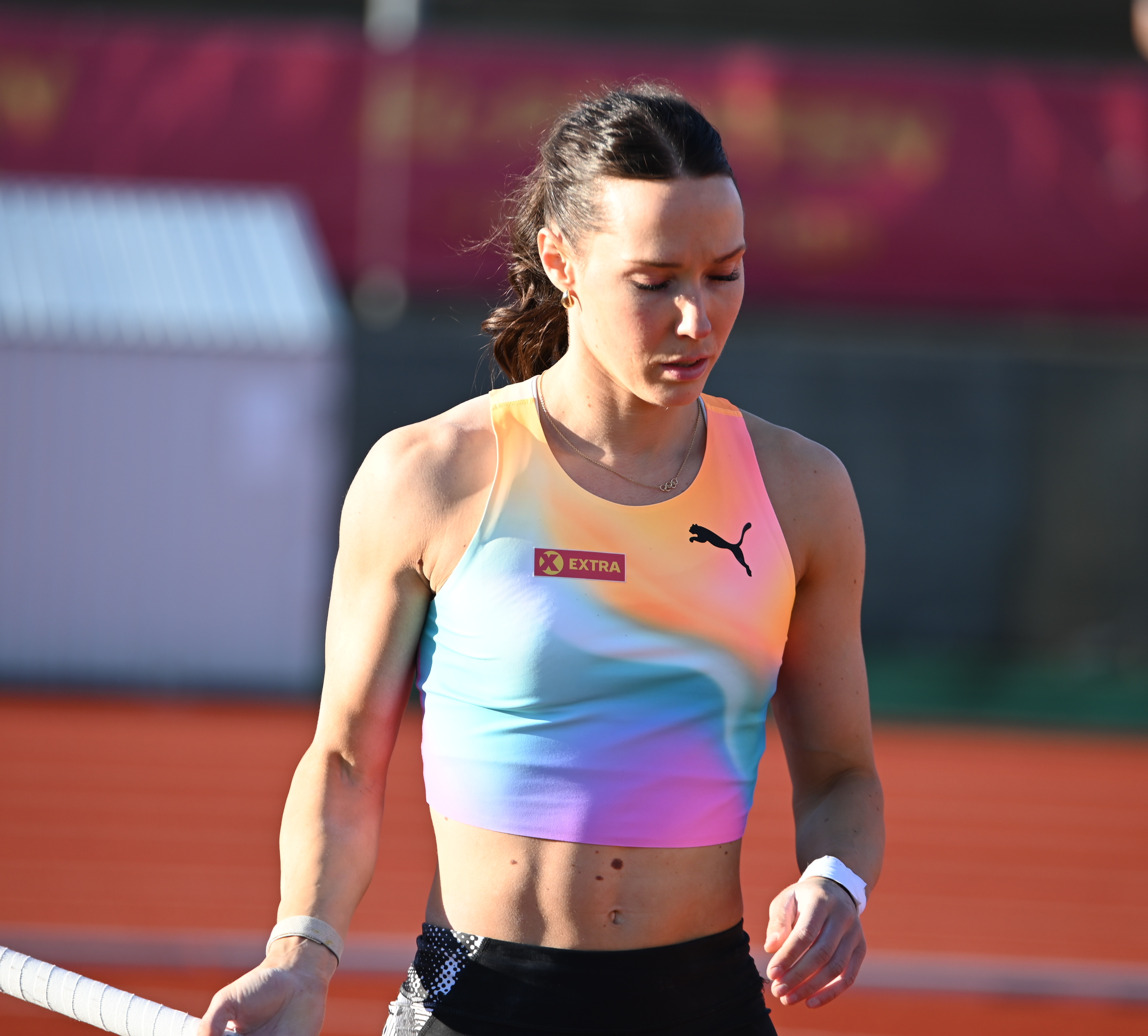
- Retzius in 2026

Personal information
- Full name: Lene Onsrud Retzius
- Born: 4 January 1996 (age 30) Moelv, Norway
- Height: 1.78 m (5 ft 10 in)

Sport
- Country: Norway
- Sport: Athletics
- Event: Pole vault

Lene Onsrud Retzius (born 4 January 1996) is a Norwegian pole vaulter.

She finished eighth at the 2013 World Youth Championships, tenth at the 2015 European Junior Championships, and eighth at the 2017 European U23 Championships. She also competed at the 2014 World Junior Championships, the 2018 European Championships and the 2019 World Championships without reaching the final.

She became Norwegian champion in 2014, 2015, 2016, 2017 and 2019, and won silver medals in 2011 and 2018. She represented Moelven IL through 2014, then IL i BUL from 2015 on.

Her personal best jump is 4.50 metres, achieved in May 2018 in Oslo. Indoors she has 4.51 metres, achieved in August 2019 in Sandnes. These are both current Norwegian records.

By winning a competition in Düsseldorf in August 2025 by jumping 4.73 m, she improved her own personal record and Norwegian record (from previously 4.70 m), which also qualified her for the 2025 World Athletics Championships in Tokyo.

She has a twin brother.
