= Saga Andersson =

Finnish athlete

Personal information
- Nationality: Finnish
- Born: 30 March 2000 (age 26)

Sport
- Sport: Athletics
- Event: Pole Vault

Achievements and titles
- Personal bests: Pole vault: 4.57m (Keuruu, 2026)

Saga Andersson (born 30 March 2000) is a track and field athlete from Finland. She has won multiple Finnish indoor national championships in the pole vault.

== Early life ==
Andersson trains in Myllypuro in eastern Helsinki, and competes for Espoo IF. She is coached by her father Björn Andersson. Her younger sister Silja Andersson also competes as a pole vaulter.

== Career ==
In 2017, Andersson set a personal best height of 4.42m and finished fourth in the pole vault at the 2017 European Athletics U20 Championships. She won the Finnish Indoor Athletics Championships title that year, and retained her title in 2018.

In February 2022, she won the Finnish Indoor Athletics Championships in Kuopio. In June 2022, Andersson set a new personal best clearance of 4.43m. She finished second behind Elina Lampela at the Finnish Athletics Championships in June 2022, with a height of 4.25 metres. Later that year, she competed at the 2022 World Athletics Championships in Eugene, Oregon, finishing in 16th place. Later that year she also competed at 2022 European Athletics Championships in Munich, finishing in 13th place.

Andersson finished second behind Lampela again at the Finnish Indoor Championships in February 2023. Andersson improved her personal best to 4.50m at the Nordic Championships in Copenhagen in May 2023. She was runner-up to Wilma Murto at the 2023 Finnish Championships with 4.40 metres.

Andersson was runner-up to her sister at the 2025 Finnish Indoor Championships. She was named in the Finnish team for the 2024 European Athletics Championships in Rome, but did not progress to the final. She competed at the 2025 European Athletics Indoor Championships in Apeldoorn, Netherlands, but did not progress to the final.

Andersson competed at the 2025 World Athletics Championships in Tokyo, Japan, in September 2025, without advancing to the final.

Andersson was runner-up to Wilma Murto at the 2026 Finnish Indoor Championships with a clearance of 4.41 metres in Espoo. In August 2026, she competed at the 2026 European Athletics Championships in Birmingham, England.

== Personal life ==
Andersson has a following on social media, and has posted videos on social media which have had millions of views.
