= Elina Lampela =

Finnish athlete (born 1998)

Personal information
- Nationality: Finnish
- Born: 18 February 1998 (age 28) Irving, Texas, United States

Sport
- Sport: Track and Field
- Event: Pole vault

Achievements and titles
- Personal bests: Pole vault: 4.70m (Apeldoorn, 2025)

Elina Lampela (born 18 February 1998) is a Finnish athlete who competes in the pole vault. She has competed for Finland at multiple major championships including the 2020 and 2024 Olympic Games. She finished in fourth place at both the 2024 European Athletics Championships and 2025 European Athletics Indoor Championships.

== Career ==
In July 2021 Lampela was confirmed as part of the Finnish team for the delayed 2020 Summer Olympics in Tokyo, but did not progress to the final.

In 2022 Lampela took part in the World Championships in Eugene, Oregon and the European Championships in Munich. She qualified for the final in Munich and finished eleventh overall with a height of 4.40 metres.

Lampela competed at the 2023 European Athletics Indoor Championships in Istanbul, Turkey and cleared 4.45 metres but did not progress to the final. She competed at the 2023 World Athletics Championships in Budapest where she cleared 4.50 metres without qualifying for the final.

She was named in the Finnish team for the 2024 European Athletics Championships in Rome and placed in a share for fourth place overall with a height of 4.58 metres. She subsequently competed in the pole vault at the 2024 Paris Olympics, qualifying for the final with a clearance of 4.55 metres and placing fourteenth overall.

She cleared 4.50 metres to win the Finnish Indoor title in February 2025. She jumped two personal best heights whilst competing at the 2025 European Athletics Indoor Championships in Apeldoorn, eventually finishing in fourth place with a clearance of 4.70 metres in March 2025. Later that month, she competed at the 2025 World Athletics Indoor Championships in Nanjing, China, placing twelfth overall.

She competed at the 2025 World Athletics Championships in Tokyo, Japan, in September 2025, without advancing to the final.

== Personal life ==
Lampela moved from Oulu in northern Finland to Helsinki in 2018 and lives in Viikki. Lampela is studying molecular bioscience at the University of Helsinki.
