= 2023 European Athletics Indoor Championships – Women's pole vault =

Women's pole vault at the 2023 European Athletics Indoor Championships
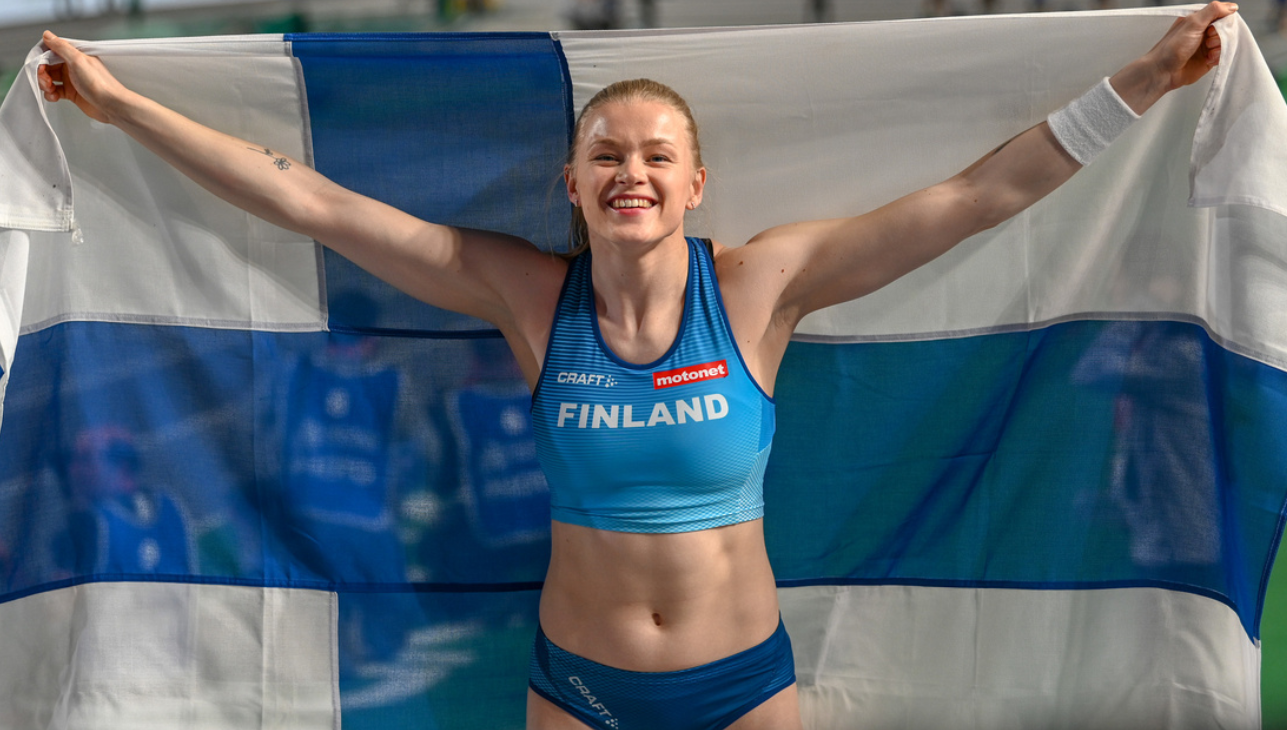
- Wilma Murto shortly after the final.
- Venue: Ataköy Athletics Arena
- Location: Istanbul, Turkey
- Dates: 3 March 2023 (qualification); 4 March 2023 (final)
- Competitors: 19 from 14 nations
- Winning mark: 4.80 m =NR

Medalists
gold medal	Wilma Murto	Finland
silver medal	Tina Šutej	Slovenia
bronze medal	Amálie Švábíková	Czech Republic

The women's pole vault event at the 2023 European Athletics Indoor Championships was held on 3 March at 09:15 (qualification) and on 4 March at 19:05 local time.

== Records ==
Standing records prior to the 2023 European Athletics Indoor Championships
World record	Jenn Suhr (USA)	5.02	Albuquerque, United States	2 March 2013
European record	Yelena Isinbayeva (RUS)	5.01	Stockholm, Sweden	23 February 2012
Championship record	Yelena Isinbayeva (RUS)	4.90	Madrid, Spain	6 March 2005
World Leading	Katie Moon (USA)	4.83	Liévin, France	15 February 2023
European Leading	Tina Šutej (SLO)	4.82	Ostrava, Czech Republic	2 February 2023

== Results ==
=== Qualification ===
Qualification: Qualifying performance 4.65 (Q) or at least 8 best performers (q) advance to the Final.

Rank	Athlete	Nationality	4.10	4.30	4.45	4.55	Result	Note
1	Wilma Murto	Finland	–	o	o	o	4.55	q
1	Tina Šutej	Slovenia	–	–	o	o	4.55	q
3	Katerina Stefanidi	Greece	–	–	xo	o	4.55	q
4	Michaela Meijer	Sweden	xo	xo	xxo	o	4.55	q, SB
5	Margot Chevrier	France	–	–	o	xxo	4.55	q
6	Angelica Moser	Switzerland	–	xo	o	xxo	4.55	q
7	Roberta Bruni	Italy	o	o	o	xx–	4.45	q
7	Amálie Švábíková	Czech Republic	–	–	o	xx–	4.45	q
9	Elisa Molinarolo	Italy	o	xo	o	xxx	4.45	
10	Ninon Chapelle	France	–	o	xo	xxx	4.45	=SB
10	Elina Lampela	Finland	o	o	xo	xxx	4.45	
12	Lene Onsrud Retzius	Norway	xo	o	xo	xxx	4.45	SB
13	Caroline Bonde Holm	Denmark	o	o	xxo	xxx	4.45	SB
14	Yana Hladiychuk	Ukraine	o	o	xxx		4.30	
15	Nikoleta Kyriakopoulou	Greece	xo	o	xxx		4.30	
16	Marie-Julie Bonnin	France	–	xo	xxx		4.30	
16	Anjuli Knäsche	Germany	o	xo	xxx		4.30	
18	Hanga Klekner	Hungary	o	xxx			4.10	
19	Buse Arıkazan	Turkey	xxo	xxx			4.10	

=== Final ===
Rank	Athlete	Nationality	4.25	4.45	4.60	4.70	4.75	4.80	4.85	4.91	Result	Note
1st place, gold medalist(s)	Wilma Murto	Finland	–	o	o	o	xxo	o	x–	xx	4.80	NR
2nd place, silver medalist(s)	Tina Šutej	Slovenia	–	o	xo	xo	xo	x–	xx		4.75	
3rd place, bronze medalist(s)	Amálie Švábíková	Czech Republic	o	o	o	xxo	xxx				4.70	
4	Katerina Stefanidi	Greece	–	o	o	xxx					4.60	
5	Margot Chevrier	France	–	o	xo	xxx					4.60	
6	Angelica Moser	Switzerland	xxo	o	xxx						4.45	
7	Michaela Meijer	Sweden	xxo	xxo	xxx						4.45	
8	Roberta Bruni	Italy	o	xxx							4.25	
