= Bérénice Petit =

French pole vaulter (born 1998)

Personal information
- Born: 23 November 1998 (age 27) Étampes, France
- Height: 164 cm (5 ft 5 in)
- Weight: 65 kg (143 lb)

Sport
- Country: France
- Sport: Athletics
- Event: Pole vault

Achievements and titles
- Personal best: Pole vault: 4.60 m (2025)
Medal record
Women's athletics
Representing France
Summer World University Games
Silver medal – second place	2021 Chengdu	Pole vault
Mediterranean Games
Silver medal – second place	2026 Taranto	Pole vault

Bérénice Petit (born 23 November 1998) is a French pole vaulter. She was a silver medalist at the Summer World University Games in 2023, and was runner-up at the French Athletics Championships in 2025.

== Biography ==
From Pithiverais, Loiret, in the Centre-Val de Loire region of north-central France, Petit took part in gymnastics before focussing solely on athletics. She is a member of EC Orléans Cercle, and coached in pole vault by Agnès Livebardon.

Petit was a silver medalist behind Angelica Moser of Switzerland in the pole vault at the delayed 2021 Summer World University Games, held in Chengdu, China, in August 2023, sharing silver with compatriot Albane Dordain and Chen Qiaoling of China, with all three clearing 4.30 metres with identical records.

In February 2025, at the All Star Perche competition at the Palais des Sports in Clermont-Ferrand, Petit set a new personal best of 4.38 metres, having received coaching advice from Ninon Chapelle. In May 2025, Petit moved to second on the French year rankings with a personal best clearance of 4.50 metres in Blois. She competed in the 2025 Diamond League event at the 2025 Meeting de Paris in June. She increased her personal best to 4.54 metres in July in Thonon-les-Bains. The following month, she was runner-up to Marie-Julie Bonnin at the French Athletics Championships in Talence.

In December 2025 at Cercy-la-Tour, she cleared 4.51 metres. Petit started 2026 with a win on count-back over Olivia McTaggart and Hanga Klekner with a height of 4.45 metres, at the CMCM Indoor Meeting in Luxembourg, a silver meeting on the 2026 World Athletics Indoor Tour on 18 January. She placed third in the pole vault at the 2026 French Indoor Athletics Championships in Aubiere, clearing 4.54 metres. In August, she was a finalist competing at the 2026 European Athletics Championships in Birmingham, England, placing joint-seventh overall.
