= Athletics at the 2024 Summer Olympics – Women's pole vault =

Women's pole vault at the Games of the XXXIII Olympiad
- Venue: Stade de France, Paris, France
- Date: 5 August 2024 (qualification) 7 August 2024 (final)
- Winning height: 4.90 m

Medalists
1st place, gold medalist(s)		Nina Kennedy	Australia
2nd place, silver medalist(s)		Katie Moon	United States
3rd place, bronze medalist(s)		Alysha Newman	Canada

The women's pole vault at the 2024 Summer Olympics was held in Paris, France, on 5 and 7 August 2024. This was the seventh time that the event was contested at the Summer Olympics.

== Summary ==
Two of the medalists from the previous Olympics, returned, Katie Nageotte and Holly Bradshaw. Russian athletes were not invited to these Olympics, eliminating Anzhelika Sidorova. 2016 champion Aikaterini Stefanidi, bronze medalist Eliza McCartney, 2023 World Co-Champion Nina Kennedy and bronze medalist Wilma Murto also competed. The seasonal world leader and World Indoor Champion Molly Caudery was expected to be a favorite. Angelica Moser was #2 on the list this year.

In the qualification round, Bradshaw topped out early with three misses at 4.40 m (14 ft 5 1/4 in). Caudery did not start until 4.55 m and then failed to clear the bar on any of her attempts. Eleven athletes cleared 4.55 m, so to include the top twelve plus ties, nine more athletes who cleared 4.40 on their first attempt moved on for a final of twenty competitors.

With Ariadni Adamopoulou having to withdraw due to injury, nineteen athletes started the final. All got over 4.40 m except Eliza McCartney, who passed. Effectively the 9 who failed to clear 4.55 m in the qualification round, now had the opportunity to try 4.60 m a day later, Robeilys Peinado, Marie-Julie Bonnin and Imogen Ayris succeeding. Nine got over 4.70 m (15 ft 5 in), with only Amalie Svabikova and Kennedy not making it on the first attempt. At 4.80, Alysha Newman, Kennedy, Moon and Moser got over on their first attempt, Moon and Moser maintaining a perfect round. Svabikova took until her last attempt to get over. At 4.85 m (15 ft 11 in), Kennedy was the only one to get over on her first attempt, putting her into the lead. Newman and Moon made it on their second attempt. Svabikova missed all three while Moser missed her first two and passed to take one attempt at 4.90 m (16 ft 7/8 in). Newman missed, then Moon missed on her first attempt. When Moser missed her attempt, the medalists were determined.

In the final round, Kennedy cleared first. On fewer misses, Moon was in silver position. She chose to pass to take two attempts for the win. Newman, with an earlier miss at 4.60, took two more attempts and failed. If Moon didn't clear, Kennedy had the win. Moon was the only one of the three who had previously cleared five meters, but failed her first attempt. Kennedy failed and Moon was down to her last attempt. When she missed, Kennedy withdrew to celebrate her Olympic gold medal.

== Background ==
The women's pole vault has been present on the Olympic athletics programme since 2000.

Global records before the 2024 Summer Olympics
Record	Athlete (Nation)	Height (m)	Location	Date
World record	Yelena Isinbayeva (RUS)	5.06	Zürich, Switzerland	28 August 2009
Olympic record	Yelena Isinbayeva (RUS)	5.05	Beijing, China	18 August 2008
World leading	Molly Caudery (GBR)	4.92	Toulouse, France	22 June 2024

Area records before the 2024 Summer Olympics
Area Record	Athlete (Nation)	Height (m)
Africa (records)	Elmarie Gerryts (RSA)	4.42
Asia (records)	Li Ling (CHN)	4.72
Europe (records)	Yelena Isinbayeva (RUS)	5.06 WR
North, Central America and Caribbean (records)	Sandi Morris (USA)	5.00
Oceania (records)	Eliza McCartney (NZL)	4.94
South America (records)	Fabiana Murer (BRA)	4.87

== Qualification ==
For the women's pole vault event, the qualification period was between 1 July 2023 and 30 June 2024. 32 athletes were able to qualify for the event, with a maximum of three athletes per nation, by jumping the entry standard of 4.73 m (15 ft 6 1/4 in) or higher or by their World Athletics Ranking for this event.

== Results ==
=== Qualification ===
The qualification was held on 5 August, starting at 10:40 (UTC+2) in the morning. 32 athletes qualified for the first round by qualification standard or world ranking. All athletes meeting the qualification standard of 4.70 (Q) or at least 12 best performers (q) advance to final

Rank	Group	Athlete	Nation	4.20	4.40	4.55	Height	Notes
1	A	Roberta Bruni	Italy	o	o	o	4.55	q
1	A	Nina Kennedy	Australia	o	o	o	4.55	q
1	B	Elisa Molinarolo	Italy	o	o	o	4.55	q
1	B	Katie Moon	United States	o	o	o	4.55	q
1	A	Angelica Moser	Switzerland	o	o	o	4.55	q
1	A	Amálie Švábíková	Czech Republic	o	o	o	4.55	q
7	A	Elina Lampela	Finland	o	xo	o	4.55	q
7	A	Alysha Newman	Canada	o	xo	o	4.55	q
9	B	Eliza McCartney	New Zealand	–	o	xo	4.55	q
9	B	Wilma Murto	Finland	–	o	xo	4.55	q
9	A	Aikaterini Stefanidi	Greece	o	o	xo	4.55	q
12 (Note: All athletes finishing in joint-12th advanced to the final)	B	Ariadni Adamopoulou	Greece	o	o	xxx	4.40	q
12	B	Imogen Ayris	New Zealand	o	o	xxx	4.40	q
12	B	Marie-Julie Bonnin	France	o	o	xxx	4.40	q
12	A	Ninon Chapelle	France	o	o	xxx	4.40	q
12	A	Anjuli Knäsche	Germany	o	o	xxx	4.40	q
12	A	Olivia McTaggart	New Zealand	o	o	xxx	4.40	q
12	B	Robeilys Peinado	Venezuela	o	o	xxx	4.40	q
12	B	Lene Onsrud Retzius	Norway	o	o	xxx	4.40	q
12	B	Tina Šutej	Slovenia	o	o	xxx	4.40	q
21	A	Juliana de Campos	Brazil	xxo	o	xxx	4.40	
22	B	Brynn King	United States	o	xo	xxx	4.40	
22	B	Niu Chunge	China	o	xo	xxx	4.40	
22	A	Bridget Williams	United States	o	xo	xxx	4.40	
25	A	Hanga Klekner	Hungary	xo	xo	xxx	4.40	
26	B	Anicka Newell	Canada	o	xxo	xxx	4.40	
27	B	Pascale Stöcklin	Switzerland	o	xxx		4.20	
28	A	Holly Bradshaw	Great Britain	xo	xxx		4.20	
29	B	Molly Caudery	Great Britain	–	–	xxx	NM	
DQ (Note: On 6 August 2024 Polak was provisionally suspended due to an Adverse Analytical Finding receiving a DQ according to anti-doping Rule 10.1.)	A	Eleni-Klaoudia Polak	Greece	~~o~~	~~xxx~~		~~4.20~~	

=== Final ===
The final was held on 7 August, starting at 19:00 (UTC+2) in the evening.

Final results
Rank	Athlete	Nation	4.40	4.60	4.70	4.80	4.85	4.90	4.95	Result	Notes
1st place, gold medalist(s)	Nina Kennedy	Australia	o	o	xo	o	o	o	xr	4.90	SB
2nd place, silver medalist(s)	Katie Moon	United States	o	o	o	o	xo	x-	xx	4.85	=SB
3rd place, bronze medalist(s)	Alysha Newman	Canada	o	xo	o	o	xo	xxx		4.85	NR
4	Angelica Moser	Switzerland	o	o	o	o	xx-	x		4.80	
5	Amálie Švábíková	Czech Republic	o	o	xo	xxo	xxx			4.80	NR
6	Eliza McCartney	New Zealand	–	o	o	xxx				4.70	
6	Elisa Molinarolo	Italy	o	o	o	xxx				4.70	PB
6	Wilma Murto	Finland	o	o	o	xxx				4.70	
9	Aikaterini Stefanidi	Greece	xo	o	o	xxx				4.70	
10	Robeilys Peinado	Venezuela	o	xo	xxx					4.60	SB
11	Marie-Julie Bonnin	France	xo	xo	xxx					4.60	
12	Imogen Ayris	New Zealand	xxo	xo	xxx					4.60	PB
13	Olivia McTaggart	New Zealand	o	xxo	xxx					4.60	
14	Roberta Bruni	Italy	o	xxx						4.40	
14	Ninon Chapelle	France	o	xxx						4.40	
14	Anjuli Knäsche	Germany	o	xxx						4.40	
14	Elina Lampela	Finland	o	xxx						4.40	
18	Lene Onsrud Retzius	Norway	xo	xxx						4.40	
19	Tina Šutej	Slovenia	xxo	xxx						4.40	
	Ariadni Adamopoulou	Greece								DNS	
