= 2026 World Athletics Ultimate Championship – Women's pole vault =

Women's pole vault at the 2026 World Athletics Ultimate Championship
- Venue: National Athletics Centre
- Location: Budapest, Hungary
- Dates: 12 September 2026 (final)
- Competitors: 8
- Winning height: 4.90 m

Champion
- Sandi Morris; United States

The women's pole vault was held as a straight final at the 2026 World Athletics Ultimate Championship at the National Athletics Centre in Budapest, Hungary on 12 September 2026. It was the first time the World Ultimate Championship is held. Athletes qualified by wildcard or by their world ranking.

== Background ==
Global records before the 2026 World Athletics Ultimate Championship
Record	Height	Athlete (nation)	Location	Date
World record	5.06 m	Yelena Isinbayeva (RUS)	Zurich, Switzerland	28 August 2009
World lead	4.95 m	Nina Kennedy (AUS)	Fontvieille, Monaco	10 July 2026

Area records before the 2026 World Athletics Ultimate Championship
Record	Height	Athlete (nation)	Location	Date
African record	4.50 m	Ansume de Beer (RSA)	Fribourg, Switzerland	30 June 2026
Asian record	4.73 m	Niu Chunge (CHN)	Bengbu, China	31 May 2026
European record	5.06 m	Yelena Isinbayeva (RUS)	Zurich, Switzerland	28 August 2009
North, Central American, and Caribbean record	5.03 m i	Jenn Suhr (USA)	Brockport, United States	30 January 2016
oceanian record	4.95 m	Nina Kennedy (AUS)	Fontvieille, Monaco	10 July 2026
South American record	4.87 m	Fabiana Murer (BRA)	Sao Bernardo do Campo, Brazil	3 July 2016

== Qualification ==
For the pole vault, eight athletes qualified, up to three by wildcard for winners of the event at the 2024 Summer Olympic, the 2025 World Athletics Championships, or the 2026 Diamond League final and the others by their position at the World Athletics Rankings for the event on 3 September 2026.

== Results ==
=== Final ===
The final was held on 12 September at 18:18 (UTC+2).

Place	Athlete	Nation	4.50	4.70	4.80	4.85	4.90	4.95	5.00	Result	Notes
1st place, gold medalist(s)	Sandi Morris	United States	o	xo	xxo	−	xo	xx−	x	4.90 m	=SB
2	Hana Moll	United States	o	o	o	o	xxo	xxx		4.90 m	
3	Angelica Moser	Switzerland	o	xo	o	o	xxx			4.85 m	=SB
4	Imogen Ayris	New Zealand	o	o	o	xxx				4.80 m	
5	Eliza McCartney	New Zealand	o	xo	xo	xxx				4.80 m	
6	Katie Moon	United States	o	o	xxx					4.70 m	
7	Tina Šutej	Slovenia	o	xo	xxx					4.70 m	
8	Emily Grove	United States	o	xxo	xxx					4.70 m	=SB
