= 2023 World Athletics Championships – Women's pole vault =

Women's pole vault at the 2023 World Championships
- Venue: National Athletics Centre
- Dates: 21 August (qualification); 23 August (final)
- Competitors: 37 from 22 nations

Medalists
gold medal	Nina Kennedy	Australia
gold medal	Katie Moon	United States
bronze medal	Wilma Murto	Finland

The women's pole vault at the 2023 World Athletics Championships was held at the National Athletics Centre in Budapest on 21 and 23 August 2023.

For the first time in the women's pole vault at these championships, two gold medals were awarded.

== Summary ==
Two women needed personal bests and two more needed season bests in order to clear 4.65m and qualify for the final. In the final, only eight were able to clear 4.65 again. Six got over 4.75m, with personal bests for Molly Caudery and Angelica Moser. Four cleared 4.80m, including Tina Šutej's National Record. Wilma Murto was still perfect and thus in the lead. 4.85m was the next height. After Šutej missed, returning bronze medalist Nina Kennedy cleared cleanly to improve upon her own National Record from 2021. Defending champion, Katie Moon brushed the bar on the way down, but the bar stayed up. When Murto could not clear on her first attempt, Kennedy and Moon were now tied. After Šutej, Caudery, and Murto used up their attempts, Murto's previously perfect round left her with the bronze medal. And the bar went up to 4.90 m (16 ft 3/4 in) for Kennedy and Moon. Neither could make it on their first two attempts. On her third attempt, Kennedy cleared for another National Record. Moon also cleared and the bar went up to 4.95m. Neither of them could negotiate the height in their three attempts.

After Moon missed, the officials spoke with the athletes. By rule, when a tie occurs for first place, a jump off is held, where they continue to jump at first the missed height, then the bar gets lowered until one misses and the other makes it. The athletes have the right to refuse to take any more jumps. With the story of Mutaz Essa Barshim and Gianmarco Tamberi both refusing at 2020 Olympic high jump fresh in everyone's mind, it was assumed they would both refuse and accept the tie for first place. Katie Moon and Nina Kennedy together discussed the prospect of jumping at 4.95 again then agreed to accept shared gold medals followed by a hug.

== Records ==
Before the competition, records were as follows:

Record	Athlete & Nat.	Perf.	Location	Date
World record	Yelena Isinbayeva (RUS)	5.06 m	Zürich, Switzerland	28 August 2009
Championship record	Yelena Isinbayeva (RUS)	5.01 m	Helsinki, Finland	12 August 2005
World Leading	Katie Moon (USA)	4.90 m	Eugene, United States	9 July 2023
African Record	Elmarie Gerryts (RSA)	4.42 m	Wesel, Germany	12 June 2000
Asian Record	Li Ling (CHN)	4.72 m	Shanghai, China	18 May 2019
North, Central American and Caribbean record	Jennifer Suhr (USA)	5.02 m	Albuquerque, United States	2 March 2013
South American Record	Fabiana Murer (BRA)	4.87 m	Sao Bernardo do Campo, Brazil	3 July 2016
European Record	Yelena Isinbayeva (RUS)	5.06 m	Zürich, Switzerland	28 August 2009
Oceanian record	Eliza McCartney (NZL)	4.94 m	Jockgrim, Germany	17 July 2018

== Qualification standard ==
The standard to qualify automatically for entry was 4.71 m.

== Schedule ==
The event schedule, in local time (UTC+2), was as follows:

Date	Time	Round
21 August	18:40	Qualification
23 August	19:30	Final

== Results ==
=== Qualification ===
Qualification: 4.65 m (Q) or at least 12 best performers (q).

Rank	Group	Name	Nationality	4.20	4.35	4.50	4.60	4.65	Mark	Notes
1	A	Katie Moon	United States	–	–	o	o	o	4.65	Q
1	A	Robeilys Peinado	Venezuela	–	o	o	o	o	4.65	Q, SB
1	A	Wilma Murto	Finland	–	o	o	o	o	4.65	Q
1	B	Nina Kennedy	Australia	–	–	o	o	o	4.65	Q
5	A	Angelica Moser	Switzerland	–	o	o	xxo	o	4.65	Q, SB
6	B	Hana Moll	United States	o	o	o	o	xo	4.65	Q, PB
7	A	Amálie Švábíková	Czech Republic	–	o	o	xo	xo	4.65	Q
8	A	Sandi Morris	United States	–	–	xo	xo	xo	4.65	Q
8	B	Bridget Williams	United States	–	xo	xo	o	xo	4.65	Q
10	B	Tina Šutej	Slovenia	–	o	o	o	xxo	4.65	Q
10	B	Elisa Molinarolo	Italy	o	o	o	o	xxo	4.65	Q, PB
12	B	Molly Caudery	Great Britain & N.I.	–	o	xo	o	xxo	4.65	Q
13	A	Li Ling	China	o	o	xxo	o	xxx	4.60	
14	A	Ninon Chapelle	France	–	o	o	xo	xxx	4.60	SB
15	A	Lene Retzius	Norway	–	xo	xxo	xxo	xxx	4.60	SB
16	A	Niu Chunge	China	–	o	o	xx–	x	4.50	
17	A	Michaela Meijer	Sweden	xo	o	o	x–	xx	4.50	
18	A	Alysha Newman	Canada	–	o	xo	xxx		4.50	
18	A	Imogen Ayris	New Zealand	o	o	xo	xxx		4.50	
18	B	Hanga Klekner	Hungary	o	o	xo	xxx		4.50	PB
21	B	Margot Chevrier	France	–	xo	xo	xxx		4.50	
22	B	Elina Lampela	Finland	o	o	xxo	xxx		4.50	
22	B	Juliana Campos	Brazil	o	o	xxo	xxx		4.50	
24	A	Anicka Newell	Canada	o	o	xxx			4.35	
24	A	Caroline Bonde Holm	Denmark	o	o	xxx			4.35	
24	A	Olivia McTaggart	New Zealand	–	o	xxx			4.35	
27	A	Anjuli Knäsche	Germany	xo	o	xxx			4.35	
28	A	Eleni-Klaoudia Polak	Greece	o	xo	xxx			4.35	
29	A	Holly Bradshaw	Great Britain & N.I.	–	xxo	x–	xx		4.35	
29	A	Roberta Bruni	Italy	o	xxo	xxx			4.35	
29	A	Elien Vekemans	Belgium	o	xxo	xxx			4.35	
29	A	Marie-Julie Bonnin	France	–	xxo	xxx			4.35	
–	B	Xu Huiqin	China	–	xxx				NM	
–	B	Eliza McCartney	New Zealand	–	–	xxx			NM	
–	B	Saga Andersson	Finland	xxx					NM	
–	B	Katerina Stefanidi	Greece	–	–	xxx			NM	
–	A	Mirè Reinstorf	South Africa	xxx					NM	

=== Final ===
The final started on 23 August at 19:30.

Rank	Name	Nationality	4.30	4.50	4.65	4.75	4.80	4.85	4.90	4.95	Mark	Notes
1st place, gold medalist(s)	Nina Kennedy	Australia	–	o	o	xo	o	o	xxo	xxx	4.90	=WL, NR
1st place, gold medalist(s)	Katie Moon	United States	–	o	o	–	xo	o	xxo	xxx	4.90	=WL
3rd place, bronze medalist(s)	Wilma Murto	Finland	–	o	o	o	o	xxx			4.80	=SB
4	Tina Šutej	Slovenia	o	o	o	xo	o	xxx			4.80	NR
5	Molly Caudery	Great Britain & N.I.	xo	o	o	xxo	x–	xx			4.75	PB
5	Angelica Moser	Switzerland	o	o	xo	xxo	xxx				4.75	=PB
7	Sandi Morris	United States	–	o	o	xxx					4.65	
8	Robeilys Peinado	Venezuela	o	o	xo	xxx					4.65	=SB
9	Elisa Molinarolo	Italy	o	o	xxx						4.50	
9	Hana Moll	United States	o	o	xxx						4.50	
11	Amálie Švábíková	Czech Republic	xo	o	xxx						4.50	
12	Bridget Williams	United States	o	xo	xxx						4.50	
