= 2025 World Athletics Indoor Championships – Women's pole vault =

Women's pole vault at the 2025 World Athletics Indoor Championships
- Venue: Nanjing's Cube at Nanjing Youth Olympic Sports Park
- Location: Nanjing, China
- Dates: 22 March
- Competitors: 12 from 9 nations
- Winning height: 4.75 m

Medalists
| gold medal | Marie-Julie Bonnin | France |
| silver medal | Tina Šutej | Slovenia |
| bronze medal | Angelica Moser | Switzerland |

The women's pole vault at the 2025 World Athletics Indoor Championships took place on the short track of the Nanjing's Cube at Nanjing Youth Olympic Sports Park in Nanjing, China, on 22 March 2025. This was the 15th time the event was contested at the World Athletics Indoor Championships. Athletes could qualify by achieving the entry standard or by their World Athletics Ranking in the event.

The final took place on 22 March during the morning session.

== Background ==
The women's pole vault was contested 14 times before 2025, at every edition of the World Athletics Indoor Championships since 1997.

Records before the 2025 World Athletics Indoor Championships
| Record | Athlete (nation) | Height (m) | Location | Date |
|---|---|---|---|---|
| World record | Jennifer Suhr (USA) | 5.03 | Brockport, United States | 30 January 2016 |
| Championship record | Sandi Morris (USA) | 4.95 | Birmingham, Great Britain | 3 March 2018 |
| World leading | Amanda Moll (USA) | 4.91 | Indianapolis, United States | 28 February 2025 |

== Qualification ==
For the women's pole vault, the qualification period ran from 1 September 2024 until 9 March 2025. Athletes could qualify by achieving the entry standards of 4.75 m. Athletes could also qualify by virtue of their World Athletics Ranking for the event or by virtue of their World Athletics Indoor Tour wildcard. There was a target number of 12 athletes.

== Final ==
The final was started at 10:11 (UTC+8) in the morning.

| Place | Athlete | Nation | 4.30 | 4.45 | 4.60 | 4.70 | 4.75 | 4.80 | Result | Notes |
|---|---|---|---|---|---|---|---|---|---|---|
| 1st place, gold medalist(s) | Marie-Julie Bonnin | France | – | o | xxo | o | xo | xxx | 4.75 m | =NR |
| 2nd place, silver medalist(s) | Tina Šutej | Slovenia | – | o | xo | o | xxx | | 4.70 m | |
| 3rd place, bronze medalist(s) | Angelica Moser | Switzerland | – | xxo | o | o | xxx | | 4.70 m | |
| 4 | Molly Caudery | Great Britain | – | o | o | xo | xxx | | 4.70 m | |
| 5 | Gabriela Leon | United States | o | o | o | xxx | | | 4.60 m | |
| 5 | Amálie Švábíková | Czech Republic | – | o | o | xxx | | | 4.60 m | |
| 7 | Roberta Bruni | Italy | o | o | xxo | xx– | x | | 4.60 m | |
| 7 | Elisa Molinarolo | Italy | o | o | xxo | xxx | | | 4.60 m | =SB |
| 9 | Imogen Ayris | New Zealand | o | o | xxx | | | | 4.45 m | |
| 9 | Emily Grove | United States | o | o | xxx | | | | 4.45 m | |
| 11 | Olivia McTaggart | New Zealand | xo | xo | xxx | | | | 4.45 m | |
| 12 | Elina Lampela | Finland | o | xxx | | | | | 4.30 m | |
