= 2026 World Athletics Indoor Championships – Women's pole vault =

Women's pole vault at the 2026 World Athletics Indoor Championships
- Venue: Kujawsko-Pomorska Arena Toruń
- Location: Toruń, Poland
- Dates: 22 March
- Competitors: 13 from 11 nations
- Winning height: 4.85

Medalists
gold medal	Molly Caudery	Great Britain
silver medal	Tina Šutej	Slovenia
bronze medal	Imogen Ayris	New Zealand
bronze medal	Angelica Moser	Switzerland
bronze medal	Amálie Švábíková	Czech Republic

The women's pole vault at the 2026 World Athletics Indoor Championships took place on the short track of the Kujawsko-Pomorska Arena Toruń in Toruń, Poland, on 22 March 2026. This was the 16th time the event was contested at the World Athletics Indoor Championships. Athletes could qualify by achieving the entry standard or by their World Athletics Ranking in the event.

== Background ==
The women's pole vault was contested 15 times before 2026, at every previous edition of the World Athletics Indoor Championships since 1997.

Records before the 2026 World Athletics Indoor Championships
Record	Athlete (nation)	Height (m)	Location	Date
World record	Yelena Isinbayeva (RUS)	5.06	Zurich, Switzerland	28 August 2009
Championship record	Sandi Morris (USA)	4.95	Birmingham, Great Britain	3 March 2018
2026 World Lead	Hana Moll (USA)	4.88	Seattle, United States	30 January 2026

== Qualification ==
For the women's pole vault, the qualification period ran from 1 November 2025 until 8 March 2026. Athletes could qualify by achieving the entry standard of 4.70 m. Athletes could also qualify by virtue of their World Athletics Ranking for the event or by virtue of their World Athletics Indoor Tour wildcard. There is a target number of 12 athletes.

== Results ==
=== Final ===
The final was held on 22 March, starting at 17:55 (UTC+1) in the evening.

Place	Athlete	Nation	4.35	4.55	4.70	4.80	4.85	Result	Notes
1st place, gold medalist(s)	Molly Caudery	Great Britain	0	0	o	o	xo	4.85	SB
2nd place, silver medalist(s)	Tina Šutej	Slovenia	o	o	o	o	xxx	4.80	SB
3rd place, bronze medalist(s)	Imogen Ayris	New Zealand	o	o	o	xxx		4.70	
3rd place, bronze medalist(s)	Angelica Moser	Switzerland	o	o	o	xxx		4.70	SB
3rd place, bronze medalist(s)	Amálie Švábíková	Czech Republic	o	o	o	xxx		4.70	
6	Eliza McCartney	New Zealand	o	o	xo	xxx		4.70	
7	Marie-Julie Bonnin	France	–	xo	xo	xxx		4.70	
7	Juliana Campos	Brazil	o	xo	xo	xxx		4.70	SB
9	Jessica Mercier	United States	xo	xo	xo	xxx		4.70	PB
10	Jacqueline Otchere	Germany	o	o	xxx			4.55	
11	Wilma Murto	Finland	xo	xo	xxx			4.55	
12	Chloe Timberg	United States	o	xxx				4.35	
13	Marleen Mülla	Estonia	xo	xxx				4.35	
