= 2022 World Athletics Indoor Championships – Women's pole vault =

Women's pole vault at the 2022 World Athletics Indoor Championships
- Venue: Štark Arena
- Dates: 19 March
- Competitors: 11 from 9 nations
- Winning height: 4.80

Medalists
gold medal	Sandi Morris	United States
silver medal	Katie Nageotte	United States
bronze medal	Tina Šutej	Slovenia

The women's pole vault at the 2022 World Athletics Indoor Championships took place on 19 March 2022.

== Summary ==
With the 2022 Russian invasion of Ukraine starting just three weeks earlier, "aggressor nations" Russia and Belarus were banned from the Championships, excising the top three vaulters in 2022.

Returning champion Sandi Morris was back to defend, along with fifth place Katie Nageotte. Ten were over 4.45m but that was reduced to six by 4.60m. The medalists were determined at 4.70m, only Morris, Nageotte and on her final attempt, Tina Šutej were able to clear. Nageotte held the lead with a clean series going. 4.75m was uneventful, everyone cleared on their first attempt. At 4.80m, the story was different. Six attempts went by without a clearance. On her final attempt, Morris cleared to take the lead and put pressure on the remaining two. Šutej misaligned her attempt, going under the bar and Nageotte brushed it off, giving the victory to Morris. Nageotte's superior round at lower heights gave her the edge for silver over Šutej.

== Results ==
The final was started at 18:08.

Rank	Athlete	Nationality	4.30	4.45	4.60	4.70	4.75	4.80	4.90	Result	Notes
1st place, gold medalist(s)	Sandi Morris	United States	–	o	xo	o	o	xxo	xxx	4.80	SB
2nd place, silver medalist(s)	Katie Nageotte	United States	–	o	o	o	o	xxx		4.75	
3rd place, bronze medalist(s)	Tina Šutej	Slovenia	–	o	xo	xxo	o	xxx		4.75	
4	Yana Hladiychuk	Ukraine	o	xo	o	xxx				4.60	SB
4	Angelica Moser	Switzerland	–	xo	o	xxx				4.60	
6	Olivia McTaggart	New Zealand	o	o	xxo	xxx				4.60	
7	Xu Huiqin	China	o	o	xxx					4.45	
8	Elisa Molinarolo	Italy	xxo	o	xxx					4.45	
9	Amálie Švábíková	Czech Republic	o	xo	xxx					4.45	
10	Margot Chevrier	France	xo	xo	xxx					4.45	
11	Roberta Bruni	Italy	o	xxx						4.30	
