= Athletics at the 2018 Commonwealth Games – Women's pole vault =

Women's pole vault at the 2018 Commonwealth Games
- Venue: Carrara Stadium
- Dates: 13 April
- Competitors: 14 from 8 nations
- Winning height: 4.75 m GR

Medalists
gold medal	Alysha Newman	Canada
silver medal	Eliza McCartney	New Zealand
bronze medal	Nina Kennedy	Australia

The women's pole vault at the 2018 Commonwealth Games, as part of the athletics programme, took place in the Carrara Stadium on 13 April 2018.

== Records ==
Prior to this competition, the existing world and Games records were as follows:

World record	Yelena Isinbayeva (RUS)	5.06 m	Zürich, Switzerland	28 August 2009
Games record	Kym Howe (AUS)	4.62 m	Melbourne, Australia	25 March 2006

== Schedule ==
The schedule was as follows:

Date	Time	Round
Friday 13 April 2018	19:25	Final

All times are Australian Eastern Standard Time (UTC+10)

== Results ==
With fourteen entrants, the event was held as a straight final.

=== Final ===
Rank	Name	3.50	3.70	3.85	4.00	4.15	4.30	4.40	4.50	4.55	4.60	4.65	4.70	4.75	4.80	Result	Notes
1st place, gold medalist(s)	Alysha Newman (CAN)	–	–	–	–	–	o	xo	o	–	o	o	xx–	o	xr	4.75	GR, =NR
2nd place, silver medalist(s)	Eliza McCartney (NZL)	–	–	–	–	–	–	–	–	o	–	o	xo	x–	xx	4.70	
3rd place, bronze medalist(s)	Nina Kennedy (AUS)	–	–	–	–	–	o	o	o	o	o	xxx				4.60	
4	Holly Bradshaw (ENG)	–	–	–	–	–	–	o	o	–	xo	xxx				4.60	
5	Molly Caudery (ENG)	–	–	–	–	o	o	xo	xxx							4.40	PB
5	Liz Parnov (AUS)	–	–	–	–	o	o	xo	xxx							4.40	R 180.3a
7	Lucy Bryan (ENG)	–	–	–	o	o	o	xxx								4.30	
7	Anicka Newell (CAN)	–	–	–	–	–	o	xxx								4.30	
9	Olivia McTaggart (NZL)	–	–	o	xo	o	xo	xxx								4.30	
10	Sally Peake (WAL)	–	–	–	o	xxo	xxo	xxx								4.30	
11	Lisa Campbell (AUS)	–	–	–	xo	xxx										4.00	
12	Maria Aristotelous (CYP)	–	o	o	xxx											3.85	
13	Chuah Yu Tian (MAS)	o	xo	xxx												3.70	
14	Rachel Yang (SGP)	o	xxx													3.50	
