= 2025 European Athletics Indoor Championships – Women's pole vault =

Women's pole vault at the 2025 European Athletics Indoor Championships
- Venue: Omnisport Apeldoorn
- Location: Apeldoorn, Netherlands
- Dates: 6 March 2025 (qualification); 8 March 2025 (final)
- Competitors: 16 from 11 nations
- Winning mark: 4.80

Medalists
gold medal	Angelica Moser	Switzerland
silver medal	Tina Šutej	Slovenia
bronze medal	Marie-Julie Bonnin	France

The women's pole vault at the 2025 European Athletics Indoor Championships was held on the short track of Omnisport in Apeldoorn, Netherlands, on 6 and 7 March 2025. This was the 15th time the event was contested at the European Athletics Indoor Championships. Athletes can qualify by achieving the entry standard or by their World Athletics Ranking in the event.

The qualifying round is scheduled for 6 March during the evening session. The final is scheduled for 8 March during the evening session.

== Background ==
The women's pole vault was contested 14 times before 2025, held every time since 1996. The 2025 European Athletics Indoor Championships will be held in Omnisport Apeldoorn in Apeldoorn, Netherlands. The removable indoor athletics track was retopped for these championships in September 2024.

Jenn Suhr is the world record holder in the event, with a height of 5.03 m, set in 2016. Yelena Isinbayeva is the European record holder, with a height of 5.01 m, set in 2012. Isinbayeva also holds the championship record, set at the 2005 championships.

Records before the 2025 European Athletics Indoor Championships
Record	Athlete (nation)	Height (m)	Location	Date
World record	Jenn Suhr (USA)	5.03	Brockport, United States	30 January 2016
European record	Yelena Isinbayeva (RUS)	5.01	Stockholm, Sweden	23 February 2012
Championship record	Yelena Isinbayeva (RUS)	4.90	Madrid, Spain	6 March 2005
World leading	Amanda Moll (USA)	4.88	Albuquerque, United States	15 February 2025
European leading	Molly Caudery (GBR)	4.85	Madrid, Spain	28 February 2025

== Qualification ==
For the women's pole vault, the qualification period runs from 25 February 2024 until 23 February 2025. Athletes can qualify by achieving the entry standards of 4.70 m or by virtue of their World Athletics Ranking for the event. There is a target number of 18 athletes.

== Rounds ==
=== Qualification ===
The qualifying round was held on 6 March, starting at 19:05 (UTC+1) in the evening. All athletes meeting the Qualification Standard of 4.65 m (Q) or at least 8 best performers (q) advance to the Final.

Results of the qualification round
Rank	Athlete	Nation	4.10	4.30	4.45	4.55	4.65	Result	Notes	PB
1	Elina Lampela	Finland	−	o	o	o		4.55	q	4.63
1	Angelica Moser	Switzerland	−	−	o	o		4.55	q	4.88
1	Tina Šutej	Slovenia	−	−	o	o		4.55	q	4.82
1	Amálie Švábíková	Czech Republic	−	−	o	o		4.55	q	4.80
5	Roberta Bruni	Italy	−	o	xo	o		4.55	q	4.73
5	Elien Vekemans	Belgium	−	o	xo	o		4.55	q	4.56
7	Marie-Julie Bonnin	France	−	−	o	xo		4.55	q	4.71
8	Elisa Molinarolo	Italy	−	o	o	xxx		4.45	q	4.70
9	Saga Andersson	Finland	−	o	xo	xxx		4.45		4.52
9	Hanga Klekner	Hungary	o	o	xo	xxx		4.45	=SB	4.57
11	Alix Dehaynain	France	−	o	xxo	xxx		4.45		4.53
12	Ariadni Adamopoulou	Greece	xxo	o	xxo	xxx		4.45	SB	4.50
13	Virginia Scardanzan	Italy	o	o	xxx			4.30		4.45
14	Anjuli Knäsche	Germany	o	xo	xxx			4.30		4.55
15	Kitty Friele Faye	Norway	o	xxx				4.10		4.55
	Lene Retzius	Norway	−	xxx				NM		4.70

=== Final ===
The final was held on 8 March, starting at 19:35 (UTC+1) in the evening.

Results of the final
Rank	Athlete	Nation	4.30	4.45	4.55	4.65	4.70	4.75	4.80	4.89	Result	Notes
1st place, gold medalist(s)	Angelica Moser	Switzerland	–	o	o	o	xo	xo	o	xxx	4.80	=NR
2nd place, silver medalist(s)	Tina Šutej	Slovenia	–	o	o	xo	o	xxo	xxx		4.75	SB
3rd place, bronze medalist(s)	Marie-Julie Bonnin	France	–	–	xo	xo	xo	xxx			4.70	
4	Elina Lampela	Finland	xo	o	xo	xo	xo	xxx			4.70	PB
5	Roberta Bruni	Italy	o	o	o	o	xxo	xxx			4.70	=SB
6	Amálie Švábíková	Czech Republic	–	o	o	o	xxx				4.65	=SB
7	Elien Vekemans	Belgium	o	o	o	xxx					4.55	
7	Elisa Molinarolo	Italy	o	o	o	xxx					4.55	
