= Athletics at the 2022 Commonwealth Games – Women's pole vault =

Women's pole vault at the 2022 Commonwealth Games
- Venue: Alexander Stadium
- Dates: 2 August
- Competitors: 8 from 5 nations
- Winning height: 4.60

Medalists
gold medal	Nina Kennedy	Australia
silver medal	Molly Caudery	England
bronze medal	Imogen Ayris	New Zealand

The women's pole vault at the 2022 Commonwealth Games, as part of the athletics programme, took place in the Alexander Stadium on 2 August 2022.

== Records ==
Prior to this competition, the existing world and Games records were as follows:

World record	Yelena Isinbayeva (RUS)	5.06 m	Zürich, Switzerland	28 August 2009
Commonwealth record	Eliza McCartney (NZL)	4.94 m	Jockgrim, Germany	17 July 2018
Games record	Alysha Newman (CAN)	4.75 m	Gold Coast, Australia	13 April 2018

== Schedule ==
The schedule was as follows:

Date	Time	Round
Tuesday 2 August 2022	19:05	Final

All times are British Summer Time (UTC+1)

== Results ==
=== Final ===
The medals were determined in the final.

Rank	Name	3.90	4.10	4.25	4.35	4.45	4.50	4.55	4.60	4.65	4.70	4.75	4.76	Result	Notes
1st place, gold medalist(s)	Nina Kennedy (AUS)	–	–	–	o	o	–	–	xo	–	–	–	xx	4.60	
2nd place, silver medalist(s)	Molly Caudery (ENG)	–	–	o	o	o	xxx							4.45	
3rd place, bronze medalist(s)	Imogen Ayris (NZL)	–	–	xo	o	o	xxx							4.45	=SB
4	Olivia McTaggart (NZL)	–	–	–	o	xxo	xxx							4.45	
5	Anicka Newell (CAN)	–	–	o	o	xxx								4.35	
6	Alysha Newman (CAN)	–	–	xo	xr									4.25	
7	Ellie McCartney (NIR)	o	xo	xo	xxx									4.25	PB
8	Sophie Cook (ENG)	–	o	xxo	xxx									4.25	
	Holly Bradshaw (ENG)	Did not start													
