= Alysha Newman =

Canadian pole vaulter (born 1994)

Alysha Newman OLY
- Newman in 2026

Personal information
- Full name: Alysha Eveline Newman
- Born: June 29, 1994 (age 32) London, Ontario, Canada
- Height: 1.75 m (5 ft 9 in)
- Weight: 63 kg (139 lb)

Sport
- Sport: Track and field
- Event: Pole vault
- University team: University of Miami

Achievements and titles
- Personal bests: 4.85 m (15 ft 11 in) NR, Paris, France 2024; 4.83 m (15 ft 10 in) NRi, Clermont-Ferrand, France 2024
Medal record
Women's pole vault
Representing Canada
Olympic Games
Bronze medal – third place	2024 Paris	Pole vault
Commonwealth Games
Gold medal – first place	2018 Gold Coast	Pole vault
Bronze medal – third place	2014 Glasgow	Pole vault
Pan American Games
Bronze medal – third place	2019 Lima	Pole vault
Pan American U20 Championships
Gold medal – first place	2013 Medellín	Pole vault

Alysha Eveline Newman (born June 29, 1994) is a Canadian track and field athlete who specializes in the pole vault. She is an Olympic bronze medallist and Commonwealth Games gold medallist, and holds both the Canadian national and Commonwealth Games records in the women's pole vault. Newman won the bronze medal at the 2024 Summer Olympics and the gold medal at the 2018 Commonwealth Games champion. She is a three-time Olympian and represented Canada at the 2016, 2020, and 2024 Summer Olympics. Her Olympic bronze medal made her the first Canadian woman to medal in pole vaulting at the Olympics, while her vault of 4.85 metres at the Olympics also set a new Canadian national record.

== Early life ==
Newman's first sport was gymnastics, which she was forced to abandon at the age of 13 after injuring a lower back vertebra. After one year off sports where she considered ice hockey and diving, she chose track and field, and was directed by a coach to vaulting due to her gymnastics background. She attended Mother Teresa Catholic Secondary School in London.

== NCAA career ==
In 2013, Newman joined Eastern Michigan University, becoming the Mid-American Conference champion and competing in the NCAA tournament.

Afterwards, she transferred to the University of Miami, following her coach Jerel Langley. Newman graduated in 2016 with a major in exercise physiology and a minor in nutrition.

Newman successfully cleared 4.60 m (15 ft 1 in) at the University of Miami's Hurricane Alumni Invitational on 9 April 2016, breaking the University of Miami school record, Atlantic Coast Conference (ACC) record, and Canadian national record in the women's pole vault. In June, Newman won the silver medal at the 2016 NCAA Division I Outdoor Track and Field Championships and finished her college career as a six-time NCAA Division I All-American.

== Athletic career ==
Newman competed in the pole vault event at the 2014 Commonwealth Games, winning the bronze medal with a vault of 3.80m. The 4.60 m (15 ft 1 in) vault ranked Newman fourth in the world in women's pole vault in 2016.

In July 2016 she was officially named to Canada's Olympic team. Competing in the Olympics, Newman only vaulted 4.45 m (14 ft 7 in) in qualification and missed the finals.

Newman competed at the first ever "Vault the Park", a street vaulting event in Victoria Park during the annual Rib Fest in her hometown of London, Ontario, where she successfully cleared 4.61 m (15 ft 1 1/4 in), topping her own Canadian women's record.

Newman bettered her own national record again at the Hurricane Alumni Invitational at the University of Miami on 8 April 2017, where she vaulted 4.71 m (15 ft 5 1/4 in) in Coral Gables, Florida. In August, she was a finalist at the 2017 World Championships in Athletics, finishing seventh by vaulting 4.65 m (15 ft 3 in).

In March 2018, Newman placed sixth at the 2018 World Indoor Championships with a height of 4.70 m. In April, she competed at her second Commonwealth Games pole vault in the Gold Coast, winning the gold medal with a height of 4.75 m (15 ft 7 in), equaling her personal best and setting a Commonwealth Games record.

In May 2018, while traveling to compete at the Qatar Athletic Super Grand Prix in Doha, Newman's poles were all destroyed while in transit with Air Canada. She competed at the event with poles borrowed from a local athletics club, placing seventh. Air Canada subsequently replaced all of her equipment. Newman then suffered a torn patellar tendon in a warmup at the Prefontaine Classic in Eugene, Oregon.

In February 2019, Newman won the 2019 Indoor Meeting iKarlsruhe with a clearance of 4.71 m (15 ft 5 in), setting the Canadian indoor track and field pole vault record. In July 2019, Newman won the Stabhochsprung Jockgrim meet with a new personal best of 4.77 m (15 ft 8 in).

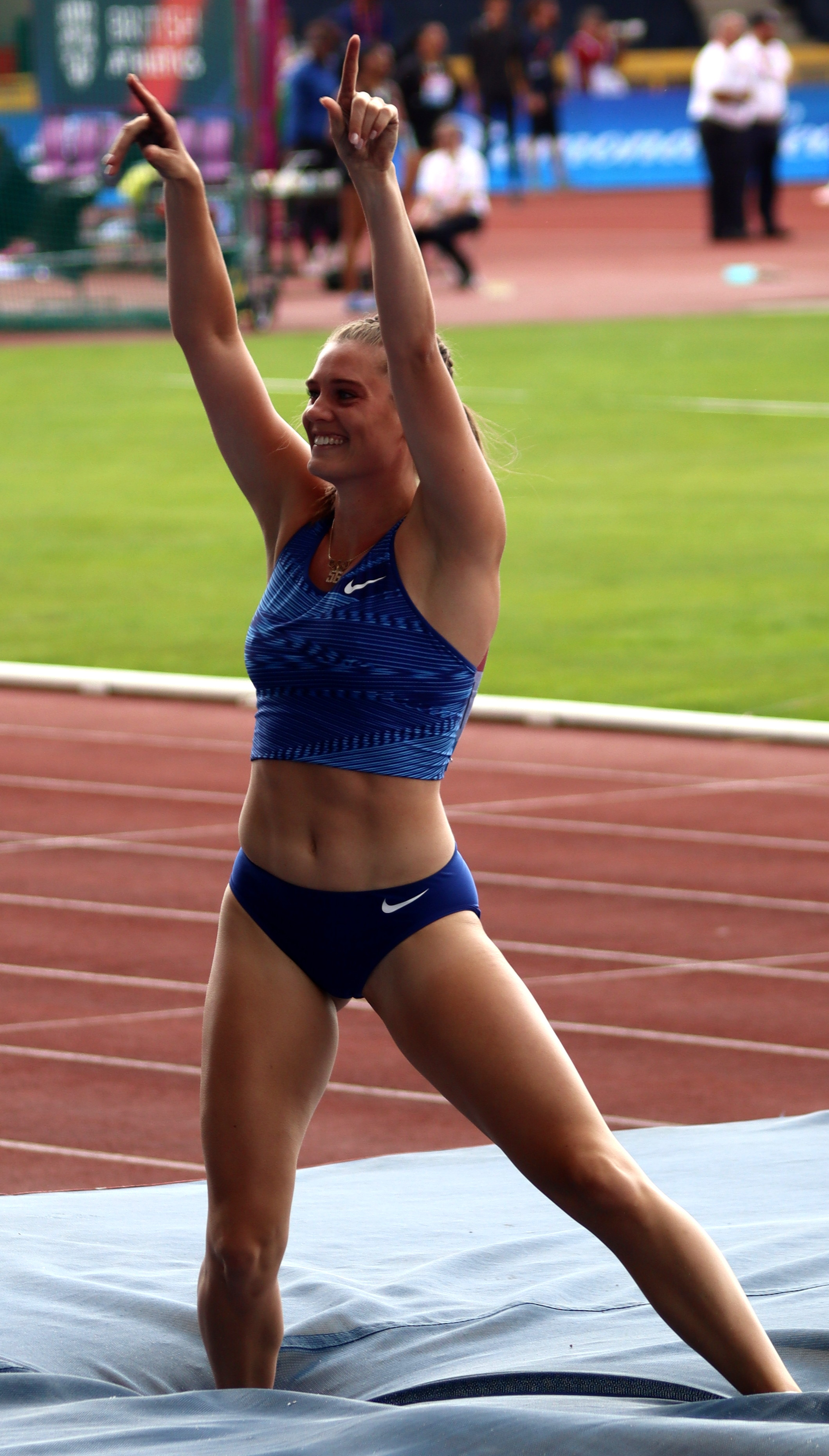
Newman at the 2019 Birmingham Grand Prix

Competing at the 2019 Pan American Games in Lima, Newman won the bronze medal in the pole vault event, clearing 4.55 m (14 ft 11 in). She expressed dissatisfaction with her performance, saying she "definitely felt that I underperformed." Later that same month, Newman won the 2019 Meeting de Paris, her first Diamond League win, with a new Canadian record of 4.82 m (15 ft 9 3/4 in). That mark ranked her as the #16 vaulter of all time. She duplicated 4.82 m while finishing third in the 2019 Diamond League meet in Zürich, where the women's pole vault was held one day earlier than the other events, indoors at the Zürich Hauptbahnhof. That jump ranked her tied for #12 all time indoors and is the Canadian record. Newman placed fifth at the pole vault event at the 2019 World Athletics Championships, clearing 4.80 m.

While attending the 2021 Drake Relays, Newman suffered a concussion after falling in the shower of her hotel room. She was not hospitalized, and subsequently would blame Athletics Canada personnel for mismanaging her health situation and advising her to continue training. She did not participate in the 2021 Diamond League after failing to clear a bar at a tune-up event in Sweden. Newman was named to the Canadian team for the 2020 Summer Olympics, which the COVID-19 pandemic caused to be delayed to 2021. Upon arrival in Tokyo for the pole vault event, Newman failed to take off on all three of her attempts in the qualification round, and thus did not move on to the main phase of the competition. She would later say her commercial agreements with sponsors necessitated appearing in competition in Tokyo, regardless of health considerations. After continuing to struggle with concussion symptoms, Newman sought additional medical assistance in October 2021 and began a new recovery regimen.

As her concussion recovery progressed, Newman spent time training at Athletics Canada's facility at York University. Proximity to Canadian heptathlete Georgia Ellenwood prompted her to experiment with multi-event training as well, and she competed for the first time since the Olympics in the heptathlon at the NACAC Combined Events Championship in Ottawa in May 2022, at which Newman finished fourth. Shortly afterward she won the Johnny Loaring Classic in Windsor with a vault of 4.61 m, 0.09 m shy of the world standard. At the Canadian championships, Newman won the pole vault event and did well enough in the 100 metres hurdles to qualify for that team as well, though she did not qualify as an heptathlete. She failed to make the final in the pole vault event at the 2022 World Athletics Championships, clearing only 4.35 m. Initially depressed by the result, saying she was "not sure where to go from here because this sport continues to break my heart." After a few days, she opted to continue her season, saying it was necessary to vocalize her disappointment although she ultimately felt optimistic about her return to competing. Newman was named to the Canadian team for the 2022 Commonwealth Games in both the pole vault and 100 m hurdles, but an undiagnosed heel fracture hindered her performance. She withdrew from the vault midway through, placing sixth with a height of only 4.25 m, and did not compete in the hurdles, later announcing the end of her competition season.

Following consecutive years of disappointing results, Athletics Canada sought to reduce Newman's sports funding in October 2022, but she successfully appealed this decision by the end of the year. After beginning to work with a new mental performance coach, she found success on the 2023 World Athletics Indoor Tour, winning the pole vault series and managing a 4.78 m clearance at the concluding Birmingham Indoor Grand Prix. The 2023 World Athletics Championships in Budapest proved a disappointment, as she cleared only 4.5 m in the pole vault and did not advance to the final. Newman remarked afterward that "my neurologist would say that we weren't focusing on this year, but I got a little greedy and said I can do it this year and next year. He won't be disappointed, but I will be."

Newman enjoyed success in the 2024 indoor season, culminating with a victory at the All-Star Perche in Clermont-Ferrand on February 22, where she raised her own Canadian national record to 4.83 m. She was named co-captain of the Canadian team for the 2024 World Athletics Indoor Championships, alongside Sarah Mitton. However, she sustained an ankle sprain in practice two days before the event, and ultimately withdrew on the day of the final, having been advised not to practice for three to five weeks. After twelve weeks of recovery, Newman successfully resumed competing, and managed an outdoor season's best of 4.76 m on the Diamond League circuit at the 2024 London Athletics Meet, where she came second. Named to her third Canadian Olympic team, she finished seventh in the qualification round of the women's pole vault, reaching the Olympic final for the first time in her career. This was the first time she had reached a championship final since 2019. Newman went on to set a new national record height of 4.85 m, and won the bronze medal. This was the first-ever Olympic medal for a Canadian in women's pole vault, and the first Canadian pole vault medal at the Olympics since William Halpenny won bronze in 1912. Speaking afterward, she said that "I never gave up on myself this year. And when things went bad, I still smiled. And that’s huge."

In April 2026, Newman was issued with a twenty-month ban backdated to December 2025 by the Athletics Integrity Unit for an anti-doping rule violation relating to three missed tests ("whereabouts failures").

== Personal life ==
She was previously in a relationship with Anthony Chickillo.

Newman was named one of Maxim's hot 100 women in 2021. Newman was one of several athletes at the 2024 Summer Olympics who created content via OnlyFans to supplement their income. She told the Associated Press "I never loved how amateur athletes can never make a lot of money. This is where my entrepreneurial skills came in."

== Results ==
=== NCAA ===
Representing Eastern Michigan University
Year	Mid-American Indoor	NCAA Indoor	Mid-American Outdoor	NCAA Outdoor
2013	Pole vault 4.20 m (13 ft 9 in) 1st	Pole vault 4.10 m (13 ft 5 in) 12th	Pole vault 4.11 m (13 ft 6 in) 1st	
Representing University of Miami
Year	ACC Indoor	NCAA Indoor	ACC Outdoor	NCAA Outdoor
2014	Pole vault 4.35 m (14 ft 3 in) 3rd	Pole vault 4.35 m (14 ft 3 in) 5th	Pole vault 4.28 m (14 ft 1 in) 2nd	Pole vault 4.15 m (13 ft 7 in) 7th
2015			Pole vault 4.31 m (14 ft 2 in) 2nd	Pole vault 4.20 m (13 ft 9 in) 9th
2016	Pole vault 4.42 m (14 ft 6 in) 2nd	Pole vault 4.40 m (14 ft 5 in) 4th	Pole vault 4.46 m (14 ft 8 in) 1st	Pole vault 4.30 m (14 ft 1 in) 2nd

=== National ===
Year	Competition	Venue	Position	Event	Notes
Canadian Track and Field Championships
2013	Canadian Track and Field Championships	Moncton	3rd	Pole vault	4.00 m (13 ft 1 1/4 in)
2014	Canadian Track and Field Championships	Moncton	3rd	Pole vault	4.10 m (13 ft 5 1/4 in)
2015	Canadian Track and Field Championships	Edmonton	2nd	Pole vault	4.20 m (13 ft 9 1/4 in)
2016	Canadian Track and Field Championships	Edmonton	1st	Pole vault	4.40 m (14 ft 5 in)
2017	Canadian Track and Field Championships	Ottawa	1st	Pole vault	4.65 m (15 ft 3 in)
2018	Canadian Track and Field Championships	Ottawa	1st	Pole vault	4.45 m (14 ft 7 in)
2019	Canadian Track and Field Championships	Montreal	1st	Pole vault	4.56 m (14 ft 11 1/2 in)
2022	Canadian Track and Field Championships	Langley	8th	100 m hurdles	15.49 s
2022	Canadian Track and Field Championships	Langley	1st	Pole vault	4.40 m (14 ft 5 in)
2023	Canadian Track and Field Championships	Langley	1st	Pole vault	4.73 m (15 ft 6 in)
