= 2021 European Athletics Indoor Championships – Women's pole vault =

The women's pole vault event at the 2021 European Athletics Indoor Championships was held on 6 March at 18:45 local time.

== Medalists ==
Gold	Silver	Bronze
Angelica Moser; Switzerland	Tina Šutej; Slovenia	Holly Bradshaw; Great Britain Iryna Zhuk; Belarus

== Records ==
Standing records prior to the 2021 European Athletics Indoor Championships
World record	Jenn Suhr (USA)	5.02	Albuquerque, United States	2 March 2013
European record	Yelena Isinbayeva (RUS)	5.01	Stockholm, Sweden	23 February 2012
Championship record	Yelena Isinbayeva (RUS)	4.90	Madrid, Spain	6 March 2005
World Leading	Anzhelika Sidorova (RUS)	4.90	Moscow, Russia	21 February 2021
European Leading	Anzhelika Sidorova (RUS)	4.90	Moscow, Russia	21 February 2021

== Results ==
Rank	Athlete	Nationality	4.20	4.35	4.45	4.55	4.60	4.65	4.70	4.75	4.80	Result	Note
1st place, gold medalist(s)	Angelica Moser	Switzerland	–	o	xo	o	xxo	xxo	o	xo	r	4.75	PB
2nd place, silver medalist(s)	Tina Šutej	Slovenia	–	o	xo	xo	o	xo	o	xx-	x	4.70	=SB
3rd place, bronze medalist(s)	Holly Bradshaw	Great Britain	–	–	–	o	–	o	xxx			4.65	
3rd place, bronze medalist(s)	Iryna Zhuk	Belarus	–	–	o	–	o	o	xxx			4.65	
5	Eléni-Klaoúdia Pólak	Greece	–	o	o	xxo	–	xxo	xxx			4.65	
6	Wilma Murto	Finland	–	o	o	xo	x-	x-	x-			4.55	SB
7	Yana Hladiychuk	Ukraine	–	o	o	xxx						4.45	
7	Fanny Smets	Belgium	o	o	o	xxx						4.45	
9	Maryna Kylypko	Ukraine	o	xo	xxx							4.35	
9	Michaela Meijer	Sweden	o	xo	xxx							4.35	
