= Tina Šutej =

Slovenian pole vaulter (born 1988)

- Tina Šutej in the Pole Vault at the Wanda Diamond League’s 2026 Weltklasse Zürich

Personal information
- Nationality: Slovenian
- Born: 7 November 1988 (age 37) Ljubljana, SR Slovenia, SFR Yugoslavia
- Height: 1.73 m (5 ft 8 in)
- Weight: 59 kg (130 lb)

Sport
- Country: Slovenia
- Sport: Athletics
- Event: Pole vault

Achievements and titles
- Personal bests: 4.81 m outdoors (Eugene 2023); 4.82 m indoors (Ostrava 2023)
Medal record
Women's athletics
Representing Slovenia
World Championships
Bronze medal – third place	2025 Tokyo	Pole vault
World Indoor Championships
Silver medal – second place	2025 Nanjing	Pole vault
Silver medal – second place	2026 Toruń	Pole vault
Bronze medal – third place	2022 Belgrade	Pole vault
European Championships
Bronze medal – third place	2022 Munich	Pole vault
European Indoor Championships
Silver medal – second place	2021 Toruń	Pole vault
Silver medal – second place	2023 Istanbul	Pole vault
Silver medal – second place	2025 Apeldoorn	Pole vault
European Games
Silver medal – second place	2023 Kraków-Małopolska	Pole vault
Universiade
Silver medal – second place	2011 Shenzhen	Pole vault
World Junior Championships
Silver medal – second place	2006 Beijing	Pole vault
Mediterranean Games
Gold medal – first place	2026 Taranto	Pole vault
Silver medal – second place	2018 Tarragona	Pole vault

Tina Šutej (born 7 November 1988) is a Slovenian pole vaulter. She is a World Championships bronze medallist, World Indoor Championships silver and bronze medallist, European Championships bronze medallist, three-time European Indoor Championships silver medallist and European Games silver medallist. Šutej earned the bronze medal at the 2025 World Championships, silver and bronze medal at the 2025 and 2022 World Indoor Championships respectively, the bronze medal at the 2022 European Championships, and the silver medal at the 2021, 2023 and 2025 European Indoor Championships and the 2023 European Games.

Šutej is a four-time Olympian and competed at the 2012, 2016, 2020 and 2024 Summer Olympics. At junior level, she earned a silver medal at the 2006 World Junior Championships. Šutej is the Slovenian record holder both in and outdoors.

== Career ==
Šutej was born in Ljubljana and began competing in athletics at an early age, practising in a variety of events from the age of seven. A change of coach at her local club saw the arrival of a pole vault specialist, who encouraged her to focus on vaulting the high bar. She made her international debut at the 2005 World Youth Championships in Athletics and finished eighth in the pole vault final. Her first medal came the following year as she was the runner-up behind Zhou Yang with a Slovenian junior record mark of 4.25 m.

The next season saw Šutej make her senior debut at the 2007 European Athletics Indoor Championships, but she did not progress into the final. Although she won an indoor and outdoor title nationally, she made little progress in her performances in the 2008 and 2009 seasons, in which a fifth place at the 2009 European Athletics U23 Championships was her international highlight. She enjoyed success in NCAA competition while studying at the University of Arkansas and was the runner-up at the collegiate outdoor championships in 2009.

The 2010 saw Šutej make improvements as she recorded a national indoor record clearance of 4.46 m in February and went on to claim the national title outdoors with a Slovenian record mark of 4.50 m. She was the runner-up in the First League section of the 2010 European Team Championships and came tenth in the final at the 2010 European Athletics Championships. Her 2011 indoor season saw her undefeated in eight competitions. She won the women's pole vault event at the 2011 NCAA Division I Indoor Track and Field Championships, having improved her best to 4.54 m in the weeks prior to the event. This was an American collegiate record and as a result Track and Field News chose her as its Collegiate Women's Indoor Athlete of the Year. She continued her form into the outdoor season, breaking the outdoor collegiate record and Slovenian mark with a clearance of 4.61 m to win the Southeastern Conference (SEC) title.

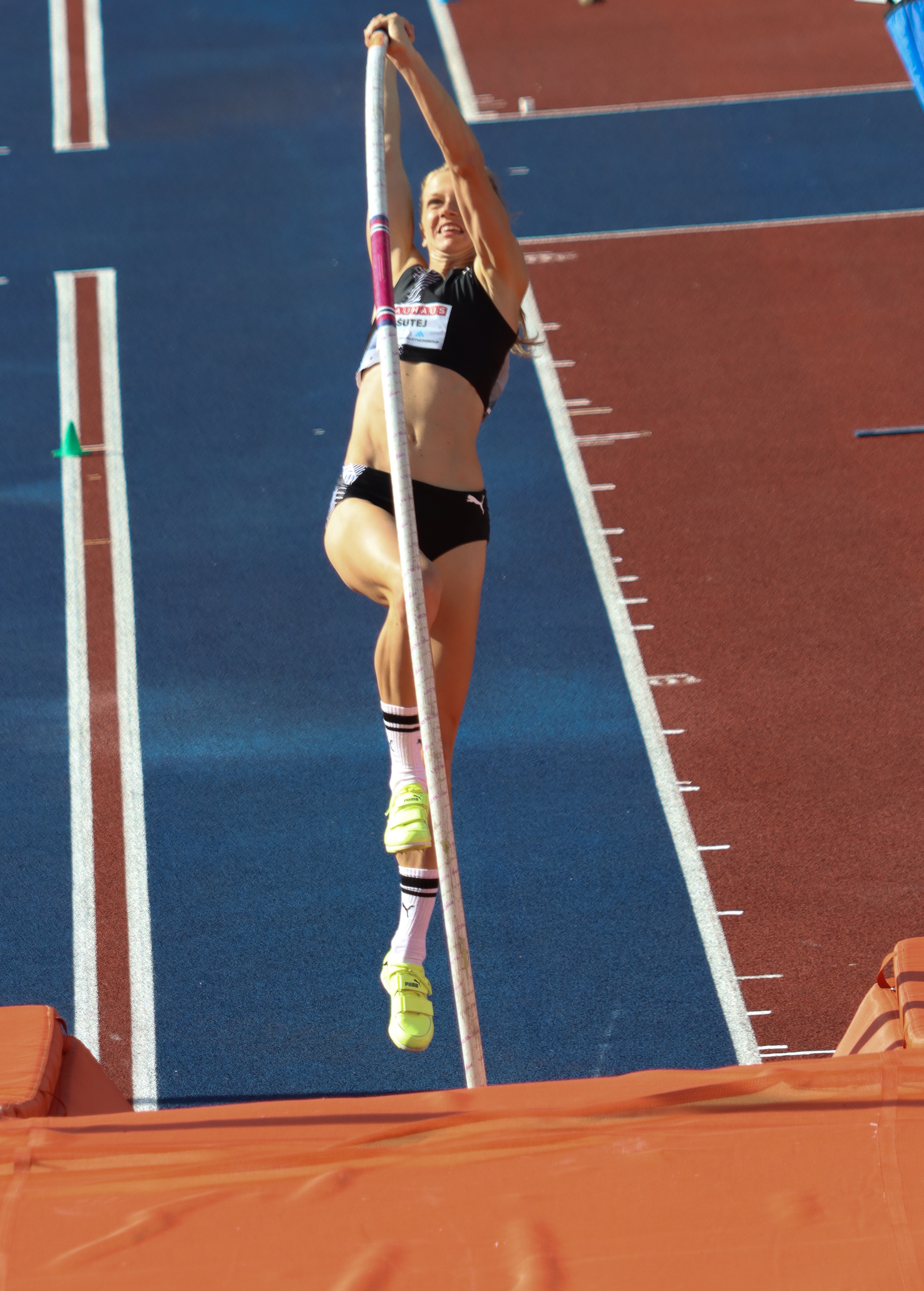
Tina Šutej at the 2020 Bauhaus Galan meeting in Stockholm

Šutej competed at the 2011 World Championships and 2012 London Olympics without reaching the final, before reaching the final of the 2014 World Indoor Championship. She competed at the World Championship in 2015, 2017 and 2019 and was a finalist at the 2016 Rio Olympics.

After seven years of no improvement, Šutej produced her finest season in 2019, equalling or improving her national record on five occasions, topped by a 4.73 m clearance in Velenje, Slovenia, on 15 September before capping her season at the World Championships where she reached the final.

She improved the national indoor record to 4.74 m indoors and 4.75 m outdoors in 2020. The following year, she tied for fifth at the postponed Tokyo Olympic Games and later improved her national record to 4.76 m in Ljubljana on 16 September.

On 2 February 2023, Šutej set the 30th Slovenian record of her career when clearing 4.82 m for a win at the Czech Indoor Gala held in Ostrava.

== International competitions ==
Representing Slovenia
Year	Competition	Venue	Position	Result
2006	World Junior Championships	Beijing, China	2nd	4.25 m
2007	European Indoor Championships	Birmingham, United Kingdom	18th (q)	4.05 m
2009	Mediterranean Games	Pescara, Italy	4th	4.20 m
2009	Universiade	Belgrade, Serbia	7th	4.25 m
2009	European U23 Championships	Kaunas, Lithuania	5th	4.25 m
2010	European Championships	Barcelona, Spain	10th	4.35 m
2011	Universiade	Shenzhen, China	2nd	4.55 m
2011	World Championships	Daegu, South Korea	21st (q)	4.40 m
2012	European Championships	Helsinki, Finland	24th (q)	4.15 m
2012	Olympic Games	London, United Kingdom	19th (q)	4.25 m
2013	Mediterranean Games	Mersin, Turkey	5th	4.30 m
2014	World Indoor Championships	Sopot, Poland	10th	4.55 m
2014	European Championships	Zurich, Switzerland	10th	4.35 m
2015	European Indoor Championships	Prague, Czech Republic	10th (q)	4.55 m
2015	World Championships	Beijing, China	—	NM
2016	European Championships	Amsterdam, Netherlands	9th (q)	4.45 m^{1}
2016	Olympic Games	Rio de Janeiro, Brazil	11th	4.50 m
2017	European Indoor Championships	Belgrade, Serbia	8th	4.40 m
2017	World Championships	London, United Kingdom	15th (q)	4.35 m
2018	Mediterranean Games	Tarragona, Spain	2nd	4.41 m
2018	European Championships	Berlin, Germany	25th (q)	4.20 m
2019	European Indoor Championships	Glasgow, United Kingdom	10th (q)	4.50 m
2019	World Championships	Doha, Qatar	13th	4.50 m
2021	European Indoor Championships	Toruń, Poland	2nd	4.70 m
2021	Olympic Games	Tokyo, Japan	5th	4.50 m
2022	World Indoor Championships	Belgrade, Serbia	3rd	4.75 m
2022	World Championships	Eugene, United States	4th	4.70 m
2022	European Championships	Munich, Germany	3rd	4.75 m
2023	European Indoor Championships	Istanbul, Turkey	2nd	4.75 m
2023	World Championships	Budapest, Hungary	4th	4.80 m
2024	European Championships	Rome, Italy	–	NM
2024	Olympic Games	Paris, France	19th (q)	4.40 m
2025	European Indoor Championships	Apeldoorn, Netherlands	2nd	4.75 m
2025	World Indoor Championships	Nanjing, China	2nd	4.70 m
2025	World Championships	Tokyo, Japan	3rd	4.80 m
2026	World Indoor Championships	Toruń, Poland	2nd	4.80 m
2026	European Championships	Birmingham, United Kingdom	13th (q)	4.40 m
2026	Mediterranean Games	Taranto, Italy	1st	4.60 m
2026	World Ultimate Championship	Budapest, Hungary	7th	4.70 m

^{1}No mark in the final
