= Athletics at the 2021 Summer World University Games – Women's pole vault =

The women's pole vault event at the 2021 Summer World University Games was held on 4 August 2023 at the Shuangliu Sports Centre Stadium in Chengdu, China.

== Medalists ==
Gold	Silver	Bronze
Angelica Moser; Switzerland	Chen Qiaoling; China Albane Dordain; France Bérénice Petit; France	

== Results ==
Rank	Name	Nationality	3.60	3.75	3.90	4.00	4.10	4.20	4.30	4.35	4.40	4.50	4.62	4.73	Result	Notes
1st place, gold medalist(s)	Angelica Moser	Switzerland	–	–	–	–	–	–	–	xo	–	xxo	xxo	xxx	4.63	SB
2nd place, silver medalist(s)	Chen Qiaoling	China	–	–	–	–	o	–	o	–	xxx				4.30	
2nd place, silver medalist(s)	Albane Dordain	France	–	–	–	o	–	o	o	–	xxx				4.30	
2nd place, silver medalist(s)	Bérénice Petit	France	–	–	–	o	o	o	o	–	xxx				4.30	PB
5	Marijke Wijnmaalen	Netherlands	–	o	–	xxo	o	xxx							4.10	
6	Diva Renatta Jayadi	Indonesia	–	xo	o	o	xxx								4.00	
7	Sathya Tamilarasan	India	xxo	x–	xx										3.60	
–	Dai Yuge	China	–	–	–	xxx									NM	
–	Nor Sarah Adi	Malaysia	–	xxx											NM	
–	Sindhushree Ganesha	India	xxx												NM	
