= Nina Kennedy =

Australian pole vaulter (born 1997)

Nina Kennedy OAM
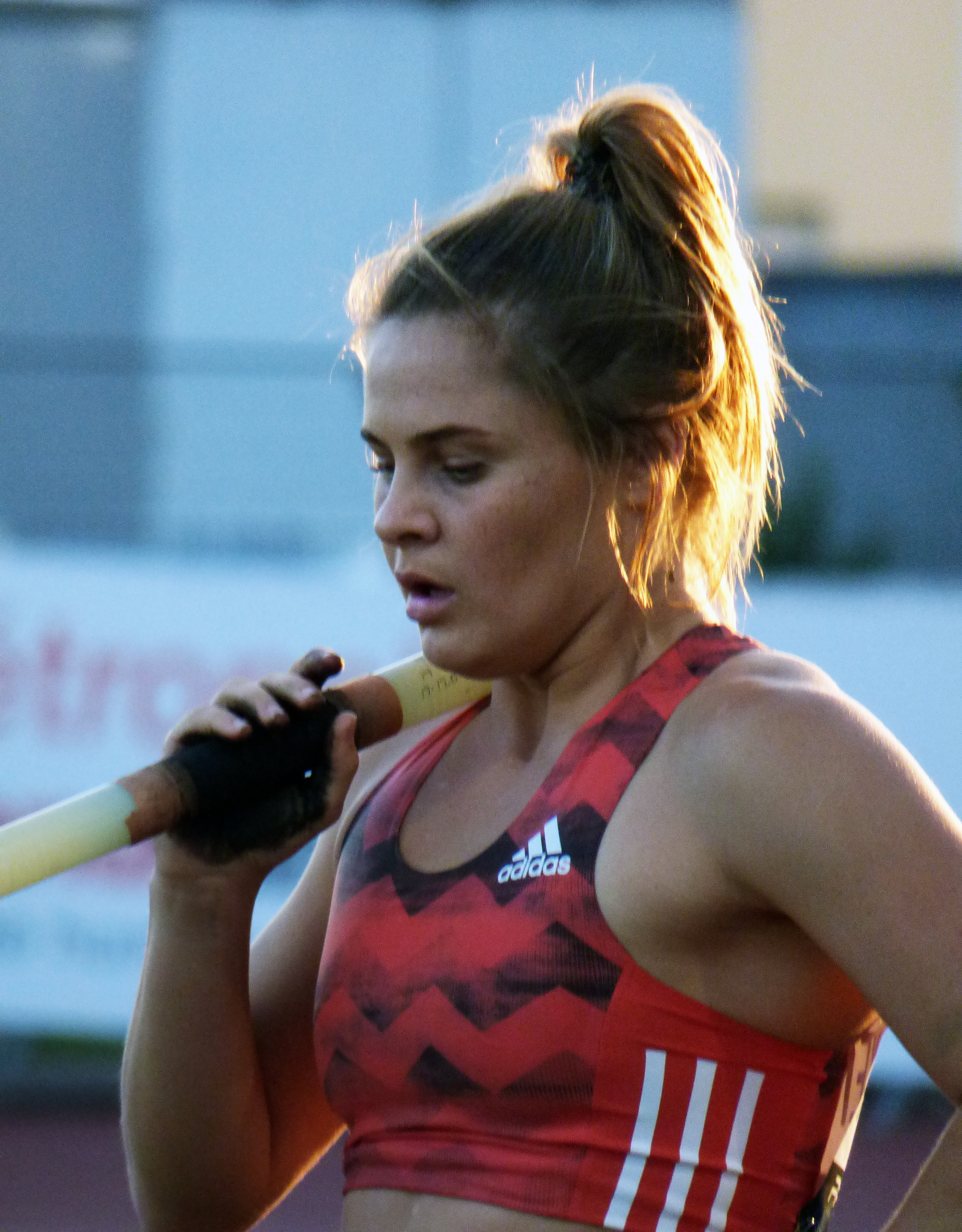
- Kennedy in 2018

Personal information
- Nationality: Australian
- Born: 5 April 1997 (age 29) Busselton, Western Australia
- Education: University of Notre Dame Australia
- Height: 1.65 m (5 ft 5 in)
- Weight: 60 kg (132 lb)

Sport
- Country: Australia
- Sport: Athletics
- Event: Pole vault

Achievements and titles
- Personal bests: Outdoor: 4.95 m (2026 AR); Indoor: 4.60 m (2018)
Medal record
Women's athletics
Representing Australia
Olympic Games
Gold medal – first place	2024 Paris	Pole vault
World Championships
Gold medal – first place	2023 Budapest	Pole vault
Bronze medal – third place	2022 Eugene	Pole vault
Diamond League
First place	2022	Pole vault
First place	2024	Pole vault
Commonwealth Games
Gold medal – first place	2022 Birmingham	Pole Vault
Silver medal – second place	2026 Glasgow	Pole vault
Bronze medal – third place	2018 Gold Coast	Pole Vault

Nina Kennedy (born 5 April 1997) is an Australian track and field athlete who specializes in the pole vault. She is an Olympic gold medallist, World Championships gold and bronze medallist, and Commonwealth Games gold and bronze medallist. Kennedy won the gold medal in the pole vault at the 2024 Summer Olympics, the 2023 World Championships (shared with Katie Moon) and the 2022 Commonwealth Games. She holds the Oceania area record with a personal best vault of 4.95 metres.

== Early life ==
Kennedy was born in Busselton, 225 km south of Perth. Her family moved to Perth and she completed primary school there. She attended secondary school at PLC Perth. When she was 11 years old she joined her first club, Perry Lakes Little Athletics. Kennedy began pole vaulting in 2009 after attending a "come try day" organized by Steve Hooker's coach, who was scouting for talent among young athletes. She was one of approximately 30 children who participated, with only three continuing in the sport. In 2012, aged 14, Kennedy placed second in the senior Australian pole vault championships with a personal best of 4.10m. A year later she set a best of 4.31m and placed fifth at the IAAF World Youth (U18) Championships. At the 2014 IAAF World Juniors, she vaulted a personal best of 4.40m, just missing a medal to finish fourth.

== Senior career ==
In February 2015 in Perth, Kennedy cleared 4.43m, then 4.50m and finally 4.59m – a world junior record. This qualified her for the 2015 World Championships in Beijing but she failed to clear the opening height in the qualification round.

In 2018, Kennedy raised her personal best to 4.60m and a week later moved to number three Australian all-time with a vault of 4.71m. At the National Championships she vaulted a 4.60m and defeated New Zealand's Olympic bronze medallist Eliza McCartney.

At the 2018 Gold Coast Commonwealth Games, Kennedy won bronze. In early 2020, Kennedy cleared her second-best ever height of 4.61m and was consistent with eight consecutive competitions at 4.70m or higher.

At the 2020 Tokyo Olympics, Kennedy jumped while injured, with a 4.40m clearance that placed 12th in her qualifier.

Kennedy transitioned to being a full-time professional athlete in 2021, able to comfortably support herself through earnings from the sport and sponsorships. Kennedy raised the Australian record to 4.82m at the 2021 Sydney Track Classic.

At the 2022 World Athletics Championships, Kennedy won bronze with a clearance of 4.80m. This clearance saw Kennedy achieve the highest jump by an Australian at a World Athletics Championships, surpassing Alana Boyd's mark of 4.60m achieved at the 2015 World Athletics Championships held in Beijing. The next month, at the 2022 Commonwealth Games, Kennedy won gold with a clearance of 4.60m.

At the 2023 World Athletics Championships, Kennedy won gold with a clearance of 4.90m, which she shared with the American athlete Katie Moon.

After winning her Olympic gold medal, Kennedy attended a club in Paris until the early morning, returning to the Olympic Village around 6:30 or 7:00 AM. She went directly from her event, still wearing her competition shorts and sneakers, along with an oversized T-shirt.

For competitions such as the Olympic Games, Kennedy travels with approximately 12 poles, each of different stiffnesses. She selects poles based on the height of the bar, starting with softer poles for lower heights (e.g., 4.40m) and progressively using stiffer poles for higher attempts (e.g., up to 4.90m).

== Competition record ==
Year	Competition	Venue	Position	Notes
Representing Australia
2013	World Youth Championships	Donetsk, Ukraine	5th	4.05 m
2014	World Junior Championships	Eugene, Oregon, US	4th	4.40 m
2015	World Championships	Beijing, China	–	NM
2016	World U20 Championships	Bydgoszcz, Poland	–	NM
2018	World Indoor Championships	Birmingham, United Kingdom	8th	4.60 m
2018	Commonwealth Games	Gold Coast, Australia	3rd	4.60 m
2021	Olympic Games	Tokyo, Japan	22nd (q)	4.40 m
2022	World Championships	Eugene, Oregon, US	3rd	4.80 m
2022	Commonwealth Games	Birmingham, United Kingdom	1st	4.60 m
2023	World Championships	Budapest, Hungary	1st=	4.90 m
2024	Olympic Games	Paris, France	1st	4.90 m
2026	Commonwealth Games	Glasgow, United Kingdom	2nd	4.65 m
