= Angelica Moser =

Swiss pole vaulter (born 1997)

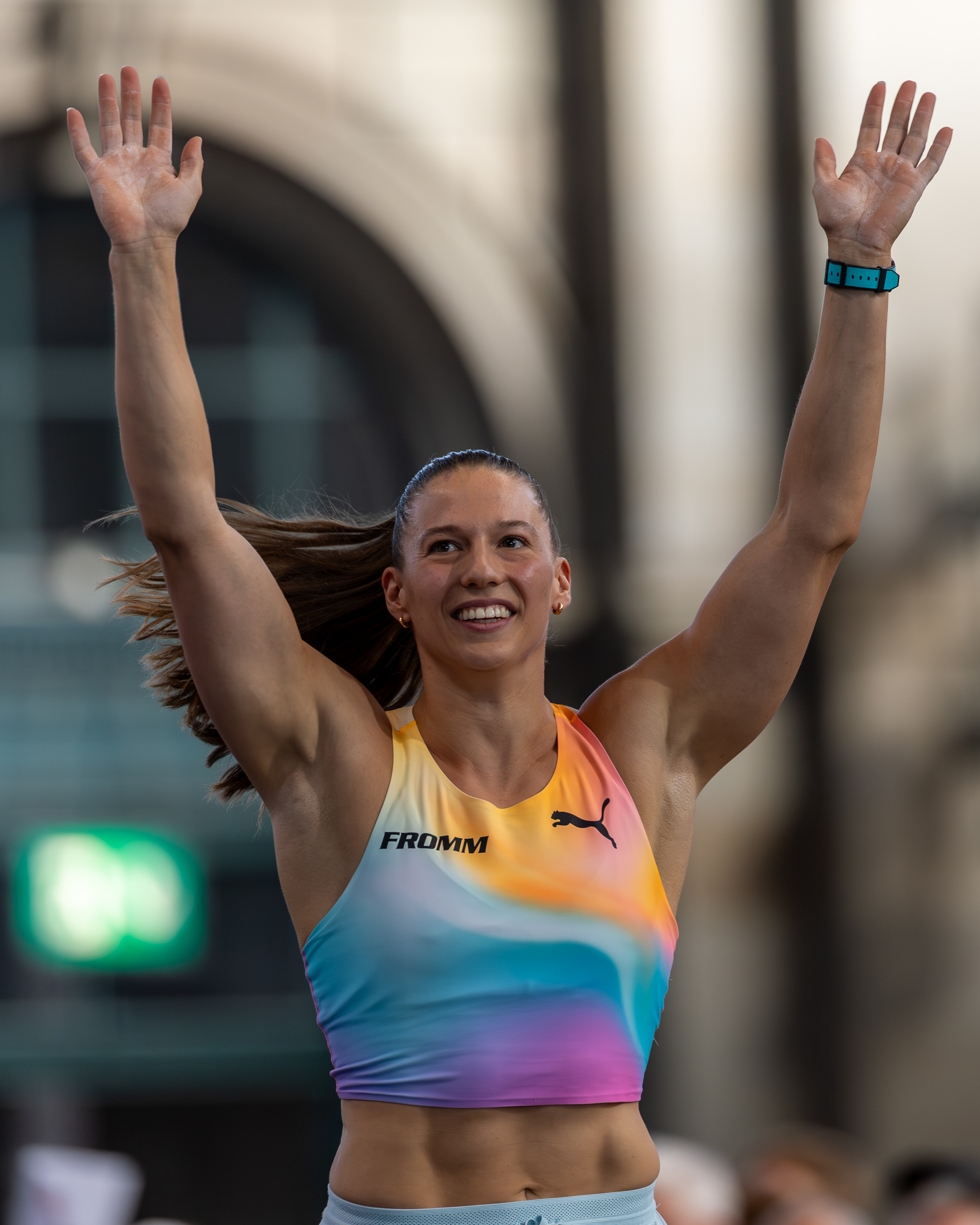
- Angelica Moser in the Pole Vault at the 2026 Wanda Diamond League’s Weltklasse Zürich athletics competition.

Personal information
- Born: 9 October 1997 (age 29) Plano, Texas, United States
- Height: 170 cm (5 ft 7 in)
- Weight: 65 kg (143 lb)

Sport
- Sport: Track and field
- Event: Pole vault
- Club: LV Winterthur
Medal record
Women's athletics
Representing Switzerland
World Ultimate Championship
Third place	2026 Budapest	Pole vault
World Indoor Championships
Bronze medal – third place	2025 Nanjing	Pole vault
Bronze medal – third place	2026 Toruń	Pole vault
European Championships
Gold medal – first place	2024 Rome	Pole vault
Gold medal – first place	2026 Birmingham	Pole vault
European Indoor Championships
Gold medal – first place	2021 Toruń	Pole vault
Gold medal – first place	2025 Apeldoorn	Pole vault
European Games
Bronze medal – third place	2023 Kraków-Małopolska	Pole vault
Summer World University Games
Gold medal – first place	2021 Chengdu	Pole vault

Angelica Moser (born 9 October 1997) is a Swiss pole vaulter. She is a two-time European outdoor and indoor champion. Moser also placed fourth at the 2024 Summer Olympics.

== Career ==
Moser had her breakthrough season in 2021 when she won gold medals at the European Indoor Championships and the Summer World University Games.

She won gold at the 2024 European Championships and finished fourth at the 2024 Summer Olympics in Paris.

At the 2025 European Indoor Championships she won the gold medal, before retaining her outdoor title at the 2026 European Championships.

As of August 2026, her personal bests are 4.88 metres outdoors (Monaco 2024) and 4.80 metres indoors (Apeldoorn 2025).

Angelica Moser takes silver in the women’s pole vault at Weltklasse Zürich on 26 August 2026 at Zurich Main Station. She clears 4.85 m, a Swiss indoor record, behind Hana Moll (USA, 4.90 m) — her first podium at Weltklasse Zürich.

== Personal life ==
Moser was born in Texas in the United States and grew up in Andelfingen in the Zürcher Weinland. She is the daughter of former decathlete Severin Moser.

Moser studies business administration at the University of Bern.

== Competition record ==
Year	Competition	Venue	Position	Notes
Representing Switzerland
2013	European Youth Olympic Festival	Utrecht, Netherlands	1st	4.07 m
2014	Youth Olympic Games	Nanjing, China	1st	4.36 m
2015	European Indoor Championships	Prague, Czech Republic	21st (q)	4.10 m
2015	European Junior Championships	Eskilstuna, Sweden	1st	4.35 m
2015	World Championships	Beijing, China	25th (q)	4.15 m
2016	European Championships	Amsterdam, Netherlands	7th	4.45 m
2016	World U20 Championships	Bydgoszcz, Poland	1st	4.55 m
2016	Olympic Games	Rio de Janeiro, Brazil	23rd (q)	4.45 m
2017	European Indoor Championships	Belgrade, Serbia	11th	4.40 m
2017	European U23 Championships	Bydgoszcz, Poland	1st	4.55 m
2017	World Championships	London, United Kingdom	13th (q)	4.50 m
2018	European Championships	Berlin, Germany	20th (q)	4.20 m
2019	European Indoor Championships	Glasgow, United Kingdom	4th	4.65 m
2019	European U23 Championships	Gävle, Sweden	1st	4.56 m
2019	World Championships	Doha, Qatar	13th	4.50 m
2021	European Indoor Championships	Toruń, Poland	1st	4.75 m =PB
2021	Olympic Games	Tokyo, Japan	20th (q)	4.40 m
2022	World Indoor Championships	Belgrade, Serbia	4th	4.60 m
2022	World Championships	Eugene, United States	8th	4.60 m
2022	European Championships	Munich, Germany	5th	4.55 m
2023	European Indoor Championships	Istanbul, Turkey	6th	4.45 m
2023	World University Games	Chengdu, China	1st	4.63 m
2023	World Championships	Budapest, Hungary	5th	4.75 m =PB
2024	World Indoor Championships	Glasgow, United Kingdom	4th	4.75 m
2024	European Championships	Rome, Italy	1st	4.78 m =NR
2024	Olympic Games	Paris, France	4th	4.80 m
2025	European Indoor Championships	Apeldoorn, Netherlands	1st	4.80 m
2025	World Indoor Championships	Nanjing, China	3rd	4.70 m
2025	World Championships	Tokyo, Japan	5th	4.65 m
2026	World Indoor Championships	Toruń, Poland	3rd	4.70 m
2026	European Championships	Birmingham, United Kingdom	1st	4.80 m
2026	World Ultimate Championship	Budapest, Hungary	3rd	4.85 m
