= Chen Qiaoling =

Chinese pole vaulter (born 1999)

陈巧铃
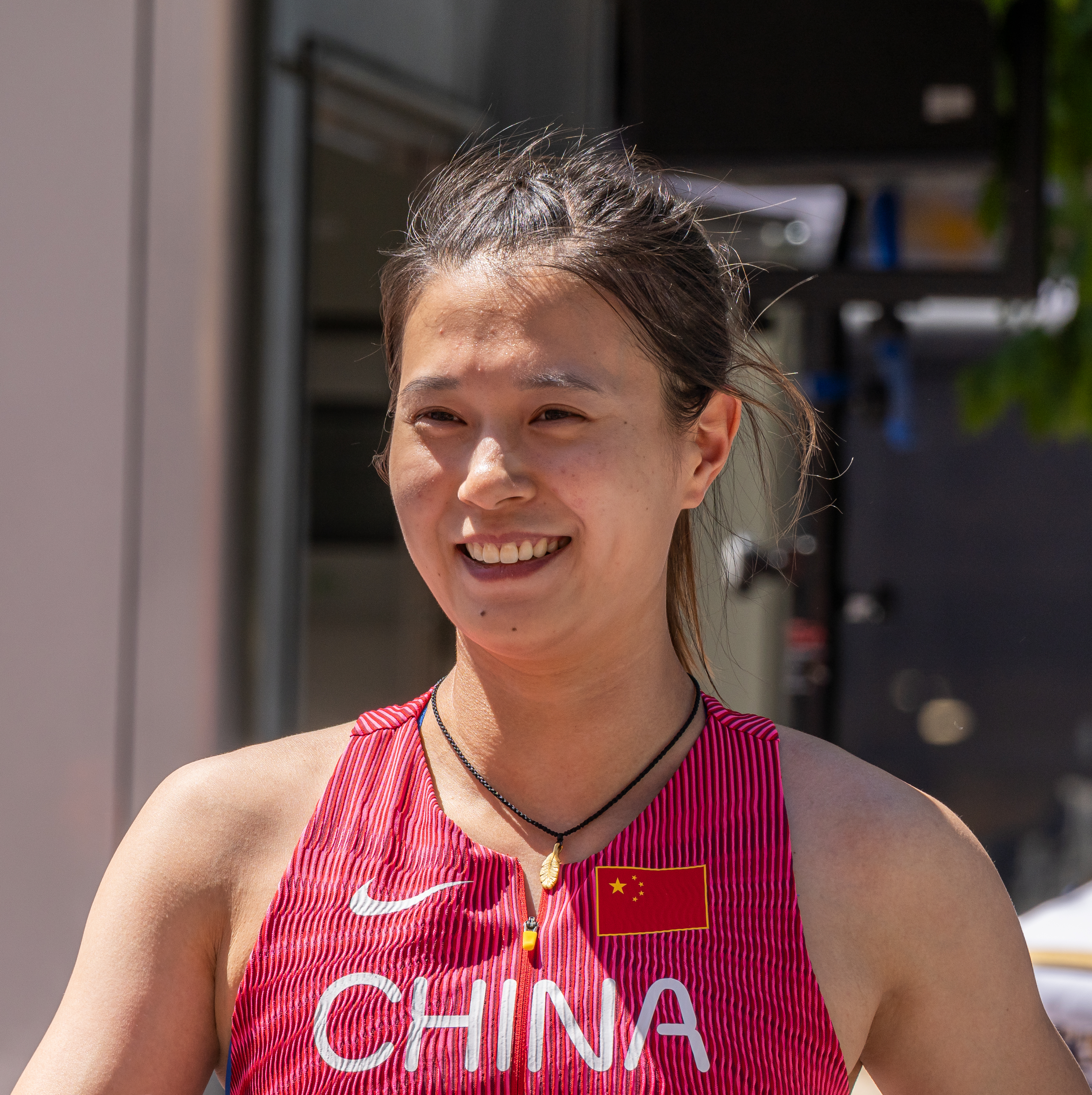
- Chen (2025) in Hof

Personal information
- Born: November 22, 1999 (age 26) Shengzhou, Zhejiang

Sport
- Sport: Athletics
- Event: Pole vault
- Club: Zhejiang Province

Achievements and titles
- Highest world ranking: 48
- Personal best: 4.55 m (2021)
Medal record
Representing China
Asian Athletics Championships
Gold medal – first place	2017 Bhubaneswar	Pole vault
Summer World University Games
Silver medal – second place	2021 Chengdu	Pole vault

Chen Qiaoling (Chinese: 陈巧铃, born November 22, 1999) is a Chinese pole vaulter. She won gold medals at the 2016 Asian Junior Championships and 2017 Asian Championships.
