= Katie Moon =

American pole vaulter (born 1991)

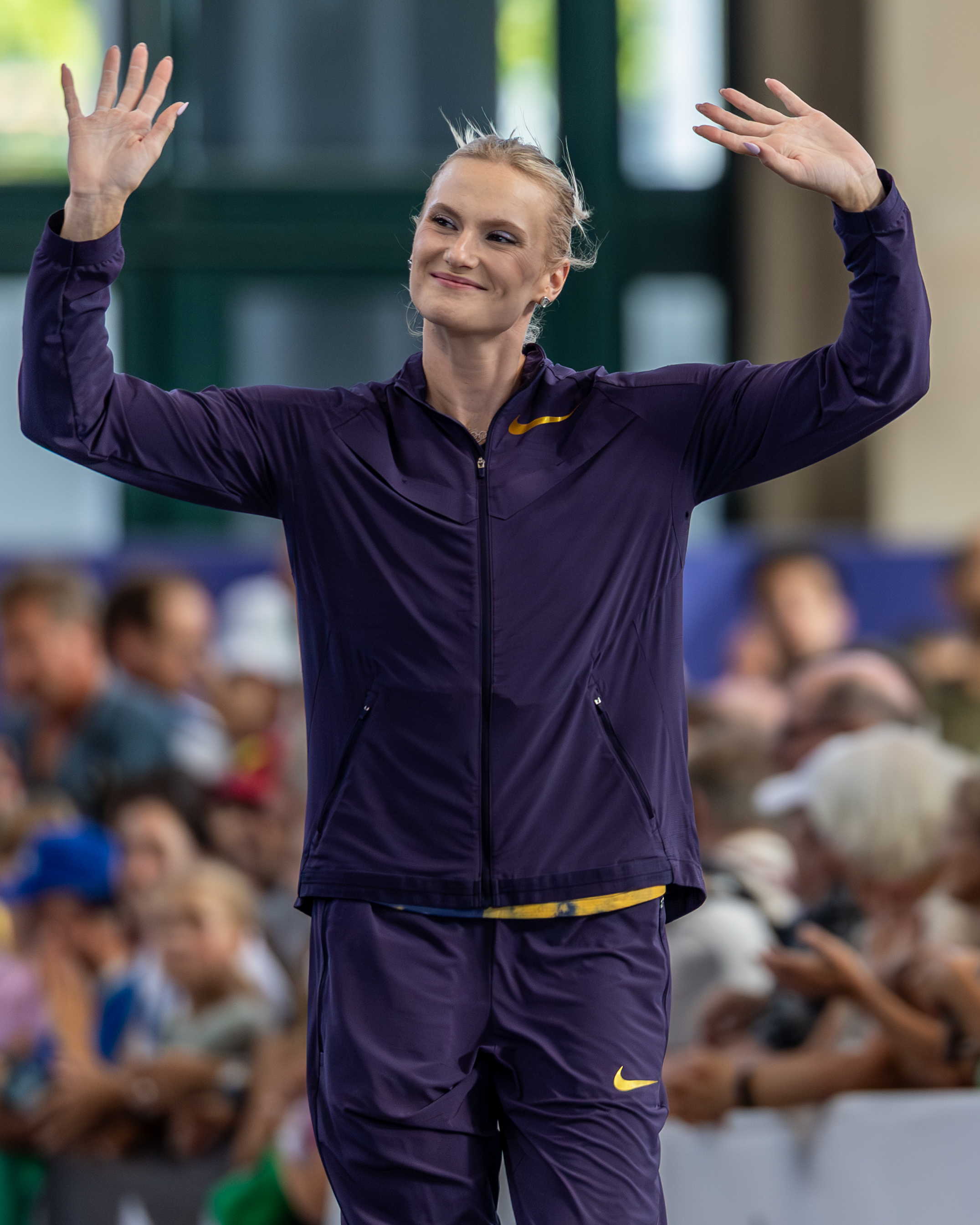
- Katie Moon in the Pole Vault at the 2026 Wanda Diamond League’s Weltklasse Zürich athletics competition.

Personal information
- Born: Kathryn Elizabeth Nageotte (/nəˈʒɒt/ nə-ZHOT); June 13, 1991 (age 35) Lakewood, Ohio, U.S.
- Height: 5 ft 8 in (173 cm)
- Weight: 135 lb (61 kg)t AthleteBiz

Sport
- Country: United States
- Sport: Track and field
- Event: Pole vault
- College team: Ashland University '13; University of Dayton
- Team: Nike
- Turned pro: 2013
- Coached by: Brad Walker

Achievements and titles
- World finals: 2018
- Highest world ranking: 1st (2023)
- Personal bests: 4.94 m (16 ft 2 in) (i); 4.95 m (16 ft 3 in) (o)
Medal record
Women's athletics
Representing the United States
Olympic Games
Gold medal – first place	2020 Tokyo	Pole vault
Silver medal – second place	2024 Paris	Pole vault
World Championships
Gold medal – first place	2022 Eugene	Pole vault
Gold medal – first place	2023 Budapest	Pole vault
Gold medal – first place	2025 Tokyo	Pole vault
World Indoor Championships
Silver medal – second place	2022 Belgrade	Pole vault
Bronze medal – third place	2024 Glasgow	Pole vault
Athletics World Cup
Silver medal – second place	2018 London	Pole vault
Diamond League
First place	2023	Pole vault
First place	2025	Pole vault
Pan American Games
Silver medal – second place	2019 Lima	Pole vault
NACAC Championships
Gold medal – first place	2018 Toronto	Pole vault
Bronze medal – third place	2015 San José	Pole vault

Kathryn Elizabeth Moon (née Nageotte; born June 13, 1991) is an American pole vaulter. She won gold medals at the 2020 Summer Olympics, 2022 and 2023 World Athletics Championships (shared with Australian Nina Kennedy), and silver medals at the 2022 World Indoor Championships and the 2024 Summer Olympics. Moon was also the 2019 Pan American Games silver medalist. In 2025, she became the first woman to win three world pole vault titles in a row, upon winning at the World Athletics Championships.

== Early career and personal life ==
Nageotte was a diver at Olmsted Falls High School and a level 4 Gymnast through age 9. She graduated from the school with a state record of 3.97 m (13 ft 0 in) in the pole vault. She was the 2008 Division 1 state runner-up and the 2009 Division 1 state champion.

After starting her college career at the University of Dayton, she transferred to Ashland University where she won two NCAA Division II titles.

Nageotte signed a sponsorship deal with Nike in 2018.

In 2022, Katie Nageotte married Hugo Moon and subsequently changed her last name to Moon.

== Achievements ==
=== International competitions ===
Representing the United States
Year	Competition	Venue	Position	Event	Result
2025	World Championships	Tokyo, Japan	1st	Pole Vault	4.90 m (16 ft 1 in)
2024	Olympic Games	Paris, France	2nd	Pole Vault	4.85 m (15 ft 11 in)
2023	World Championships	Budapest, Hungary	1st	Pole Vault	4.90 m (16 ft 1 in) WL
2022	World Championships	Eugene, OR, United States	1st	Pole Vault	4.85 m (15 ft 11 in) WL
2022	World Indoor Championships	Belgrade, Serbia	2nd	Pole Vault	4.75 m (15 ft 7 in)
2021	Olympic Games	Tokyo, Japan	1st	Pole Vault	4.90 m (16 ft 1 in)
2018	NACAC Championships	Toronto, Canada	1st	Pole Vault	4.75 m (15 ft 7 in) CR
2018	World Cup	London, United Kingdom	2nd	Pole Vault	4.68 m (15 ft 4 in)
2018	World Indoor Championships	Birmingham, United Kingdom	5th	Pole Vault	4.70 m (15 ft 5 in)
2015	NACAC Championships	San José, Costa Rica	3rd	Pole Vault	4.30 m (14 ft 1 in)

=== National championships ===
Year	Competition	Venue	Position	Event	Result
Nike
2023	USATF Indoor Championships	Albuquerque, New Mexico	1st	Pole Vault	4.80 m (15 ft 9 in)
2022	USATF Championships	Eugene, Oregon	3rd	Pole Vault	4.65 m (15 ft 3 in)
2022	USATF Indoor Championships	Spokane, Washington	2nd	Pole Vault	4.75 m (15 ft 7 in)
2021	USA Olympic Trials	Eugene, Oregon	1st	Pole Vault	4.95 m (16 ft 3 in)
2019	USATF Championships	Des Moines, Iowa	2nd	Pole Vault	4.80 m (15 ft 9 in)
2019	USATF Indoor Championships	Staten Island, New York	1st	Pole Vault	4.81 m (15 ft 9 in)
2018	USATF Championships	Des Moines, Iowa	2nd	Pole Vault	4.70 m (15 ft 5 in)
2018	Adidas / New York Athletic Club				
2018	USATF Indoor Championships	Albuquerque, New Mexico	1st	Pole Vault	4.91 m (16 ft 1 in)
Adidas
2017	USATF Championships	Sacramento, California	7th	Pole Vault	4.55 m (14 ft 11 in)
2017	USATF Indoor Championships	Albuquerque, New Mexico	2nd	Pole Vault	4.65 m (15 ft 3 in)
2016	USA Olympic Trials	Eugene, Oregon	5th	Pole Vault	4.60 m (15 ft 1 in)
2016	Unattached				
2016	USATF Indoor Championships	Portland, Oregon	6th	Pole Vault	4.5 m (14 ft 9 in)
Team Pacer
2015	USATF Championships	Eugene, Oregon	4th	Pole Vault	4.55 m (14 ft 11 in)
2015	Unattached				
2015	USATF Indoor Championships	Reggie Lewis Track and Athletic Center	3rd	Pole Vault	4.50 m (14 ft 9 in)
Team Pacer
2014	USATF Championships	Hornet Stadium (Sacramento)	9th	Pole Vault	4.30 m (14 ft 1 in)
2014	USATF Indoor Championships	Albuquerque, New Mexico	9th	Pole Vault	4.41 m (14 ft 6 in)
Unattached
2013	USATF Championships	Drake Stadium (Drake University)	6th	Pole Vault	4.40 m (14 ft 5 in)

=== NCAA championships ===
Katie Nageotte is a two-time NCAA Division II pole vault champion and three-time All-American.

Representing the Ashland Eagles
Year	GLIAC Indoor	NCAA Indoor	GLIAC Outdoor	NCAA Outdoor
2013	Pole Vault; 4.33 m (14 ft 2 in) 1st	Pole Vault; 4.25 m (13 ft 11 in) 1st	Pole Vault; 4.44 m (14 ft 7 in) 1st	Pole Vault; 4.40 m (14 ft 5 in) 1st
2012			Pole Vault; 3.61 m (11 ft 10 in) 7th 4×100 meters 47.93 5th	Pole Vault; 3.75 m (12 ft 4 in) 5th
Representing the Dayton Flyers
Year	Atlantic 10 Conference Indoor	NCAA Indoor	Atlantic 10 Conference Outdoor	NCAA Outdoor
2011	Pole Vault; 3.60 m (11 ft 10 in) 2nd 60 meters 7.28 6th		100 m 12.09 5th 4 × 100 m 47.10 4th	
2010	Pole Vault; 3.85 m (12 ft 8 in) 1st		Pole Vault; 3.70 m (12 ft 2 in) 1st 4×100 47.17 3rd	Pole Vault; 3.90 m (12 ft 10 in) 17th
