= Elisa Molinarolo =

Italian pole vaulter (born 1994)

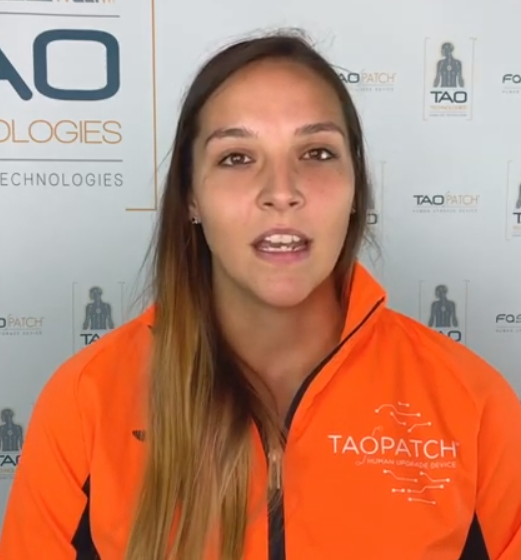
- Molinarolo in 2022

Personal information
- Born: 29 January 1994 (age 32) Soave, Italy
- Height: 1.73 m (5 ft 8 in)
- Weight: 70 kg (154 lb)

Sport
- Country: Italy
- Sport: Athletics
- Event: Pole vault
- Club: G.S.Fiamme Oro Padova - Atl. Riviera del Brenta
- Coached by: Marco Chiarello

Achievements and titles
- Personal best: Pole vault: 4.70 m (2024)

Elisa Molinarolo (born 29 January 1994) is an Italian female pole vaulter, that won two national championships She competed at the 2020 Summer Olympics in pole vault.

== Career ==
In 2018, establishing her Personal Best with 4.35 m, 6th best Italian performance of all-time and at the middle of season had reached the 57th place in the world lists.

== Personal best ==
Outdoor

- Pole vault: 4.70 m - (France) Paris, 7 August 2024

Indoor

- Pole vault: 4.66 m - (Italy) Ancona, 17 February 2024 NR

== Achievements ==
Finalist

Year	Competition	Venue	Rank	Event	Measure	Notes
2021	Olympics Games	(Japan) Tokyo	18th	Pole vault	4.40 m	
2022	World Indoor Championships	(Serbia) Beograd	8th	Pole vault	4.35 m	
2022	World Championships	(United States) Portland	16th	Pole vault	4.35 m	
2023	World Championships	(Hungary) Budapest	9th	Pole vault	4.50 m	(Note: She set 4.65 her PB in qualification)
2024	Olympics Games	(France) Paris	6th	Pole vault	4.70 m	PB
2025	World Indoor Championships	(China) Nanjing	7th	Pole vault	4.60 m	=SB
2025	World Championships	(Japan) Tokyo	20th	Pole vault	4.45 m	

== National titles ==
Molinarolo won eight national championships at individual senior level.

- Italian Athletics Championships
  - Pole vault: 2017, 2021, 2025, 2026 (4)
- Italian Athletics Indoor Championships
  - Pole vault indoor: 2020, 2022, 2024, 2026 (4)

== See also ==
- Italian all-time lists - Pole vault
