= Marie-Julie Bonnin =

French pole vaulter (born 2001)

- Marie-Julie Bonnin in the Pole Vault at the 2026 Wanda Diamond League’s Weltklasse Zürich athletics competition.

Personal information
- Born: 17 December 2001 (age 24) Bordeaux, France
- Height: 172 cm (5 ft 8 in)
- Weight: 58 kg (128 lb)

Sport
- Country: France
- Sport: Athletics
- Event: Pole Vault

Achievements and titles
- Personal bests: Pole Vault (i): 4.76m (Clermont-Ferrand, 2026)
Medal record
Women's athletics
Representing France
World Indoor Championships
| Gold medal – first place | 2025 Nanjing | Pole Vault |
European Championships
| Bronze medal – third place | 2026 Birmingham | Pole vault |
European Indoor Championships
| Bronze medal – third place | 2025 Apeldoorn | Pole Vault |
European U23 Championships
| Gold medal – first place | 2023 Espoo | Pole Vault |
European U20 Championships
| Silver medal – second place | 2019 Borås | Pole Vault |

Marie-Julie Bonnin (born 17 December 2001) is a French pole vaulter. She won the gold medal at the 2025 World Athletics Indoor Championships, and she was the bronze medalist at the 2025 European Athletics Indoor Championships.

== Biography ==
From Bordeaux, as the French junior champion, Bonnin won the silver medal at the 2019 European Athletics U20 Championships held in Boras.

In July 2022, Bonnin won the pole vault at the Open de France. Bonnin qualified for the final at the 2022 European Athletics Championships held in Munich in August 2022. She finished sixth in the final setting a new personal best height of 4.55 metres. In 2022, she was also the gold medalist at the French U23 Championships, and silver medalist at the French Elite Championships.

In July 2023, Bonnin secured the gold medal in the 2023 European Athletics U23 Championships in Espoo, Finland with a winning jump of 4.50 metres, having started the competition with two fouls at 4.30.

In July 2024, she improved her personal best three times to clear 4.70 metres in Sotteville-lès-Rouen. She subsequently competed in the pole vault at the 2024 Paris Olympics, placing eleventh overall.

In February 2025, Bonnin won the French Indoor Athletics Championships ahead of Nayah Cauvin. Bonnin was selected for the 2025 European Athletics Indoor Championships in Apeldoorn where she won the bronze medal with a 4.70 metre clearance. She won the gold medal at the 2025 World Athletics Indoor Championships in Nanjing on 22 March 2025, making a new personal best clearance of 4.75 metres, which also equalled the French national record, previously set in 2018 by Ninon Chapelle.

She was a finalist at the 2025 World Athletics Championships in Tokyo, Japan, in September 2025, placing eighth overall.

Bonnin opened her 2026 indoor season with a clearance of 4.58m to defeat New Zealand's Imogen Ayris on countback at the StarPerche World Athletics Indoor Tour Bronze meeting in Bordeaux, and clearing 4.70 metres to finish ahead of Ayris' lifetime best on countback in Caen the following week. In February, she cleared 4.76 metres for the first time at the All Star Perche, a World Athletics Indoor Tour Silver meeting, in Clermont-Ferrand, France. She won the pole vault title at the 2026 French Indoor Athletics Championships in Aubiere ahead of Nayah Cauvin. On 25 July 2026, Bonnet cleared 4.60 metres to win the French championships ahead of returning former champion Margot Chevrier in Albi. In August, she won the bronze medal at the 2026 European Athletics Championships in Birmingham, England with a 4.70m clearance for her first major outdoor medal.
