= Sandi Morris =

American pole vaulter (born 1992)

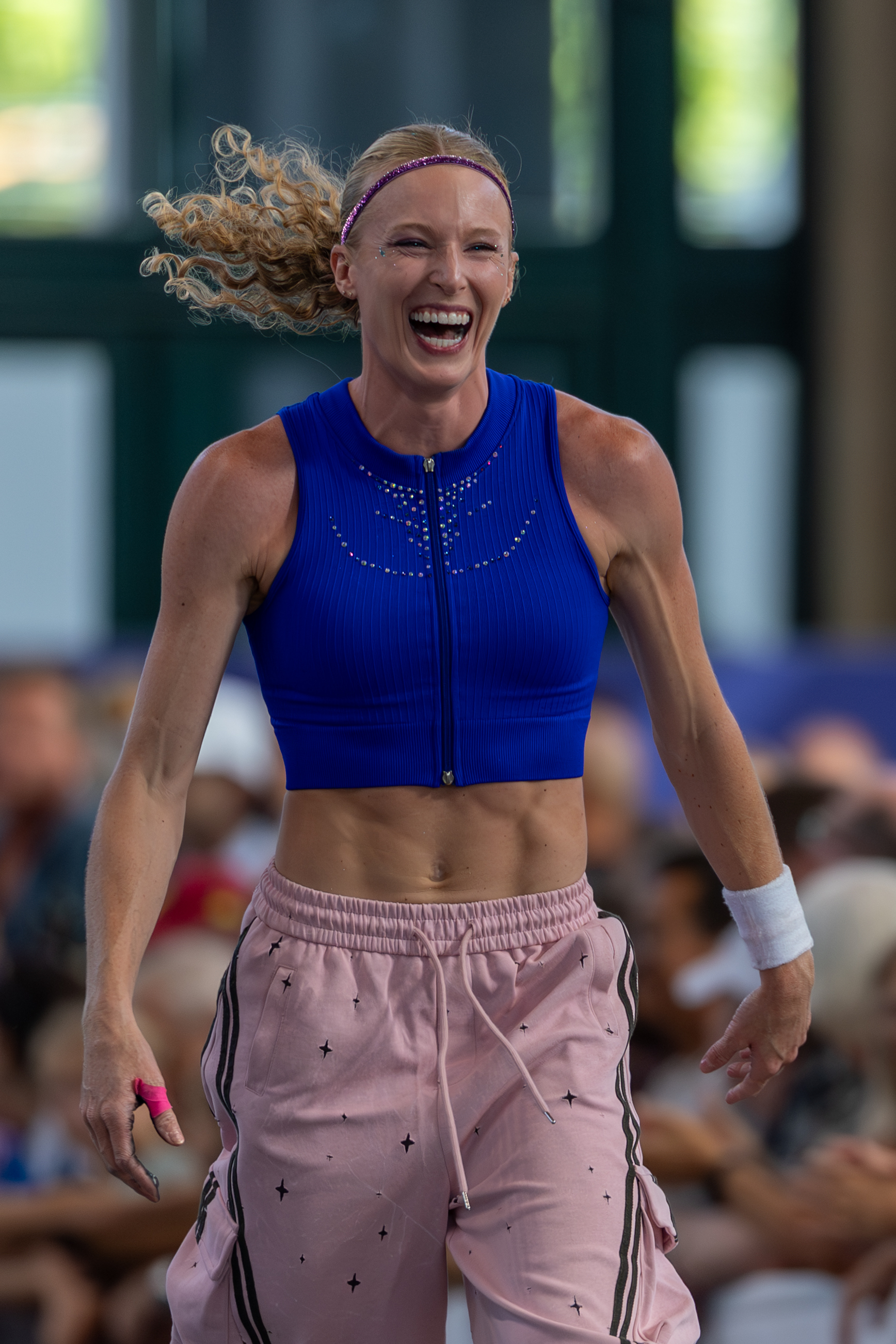
- Morris at the 2026 Weltklasse Zürich

Personal information
- Born: July 8, 1992 (age 34) Downers Grove, Illinois, U.S.
- Home town: Greenville, South Carolina, U.S.
- Employers: Puma (2021–); Nike (2015–2020)
- Height: 5 ft 8 in (173 cm)
- Weight: 137 lb (62 kg)
- Website: Sandi Morris at AthleteBiz

Sport
- Country: United States
- Sport: Track and field
- Event: Pole vault
- College team: Arkansas Razorbacks; North Carolina Tar Heels
- Turned pro: 2015
- Coached by: Brooke Rasnick, University of Louisville

Achievements and titles
- Highest world ranking: 1 (weeks 45)
- Personal bests: 5.00 m (16 ft 5 in) NR (Brussels 2016); Indoors; 4.95 m (16 ft 3 in) (Portland 2016)
Medal record
Women's athletics
Representing the United States
Olympic Games
Silver medal – second place	2016 Rio de Janeiro	Pole vault
World Championships
Silver medal – second place	2017 London	Pole vault
Silver medal – second place	2019 Doha	Pole vault
Silver medal – second place	2022 Eugene	Pole vault
Silver medal – second place	2025 Tokyo	Pole vault
World Ultimate Championship
First place	2026 Budapest	Pole vault
World Indoor Championships
Gold medal – first place	2018 Birmingham	Pole vault
Gold medal – first place	2022 Belgrade	Pole vault
Silver medal – second place	2016 Portland	Pole vault
NACAC Championships
Bronze medal – third place	2018 Toronto	Pole Vault
NACAC Under-23 Championships
Gold medal – first place	2014 Kamloops	Pole vault
Pan American Junior Championships
Silver medal – second place	2011 Miramar	Pole Vault

Sandi Morris (born July 8, 1992, in Downers Grove, Illinois) is an American pole vaulter. She won the silver medal in the pole vault event at the 2016 Summer Olympics and has taken World Championship silver four times (2017, 2019, 2022 and 2025). Indoors she is a two-time world champion (2018 and 2022).

== Career ==
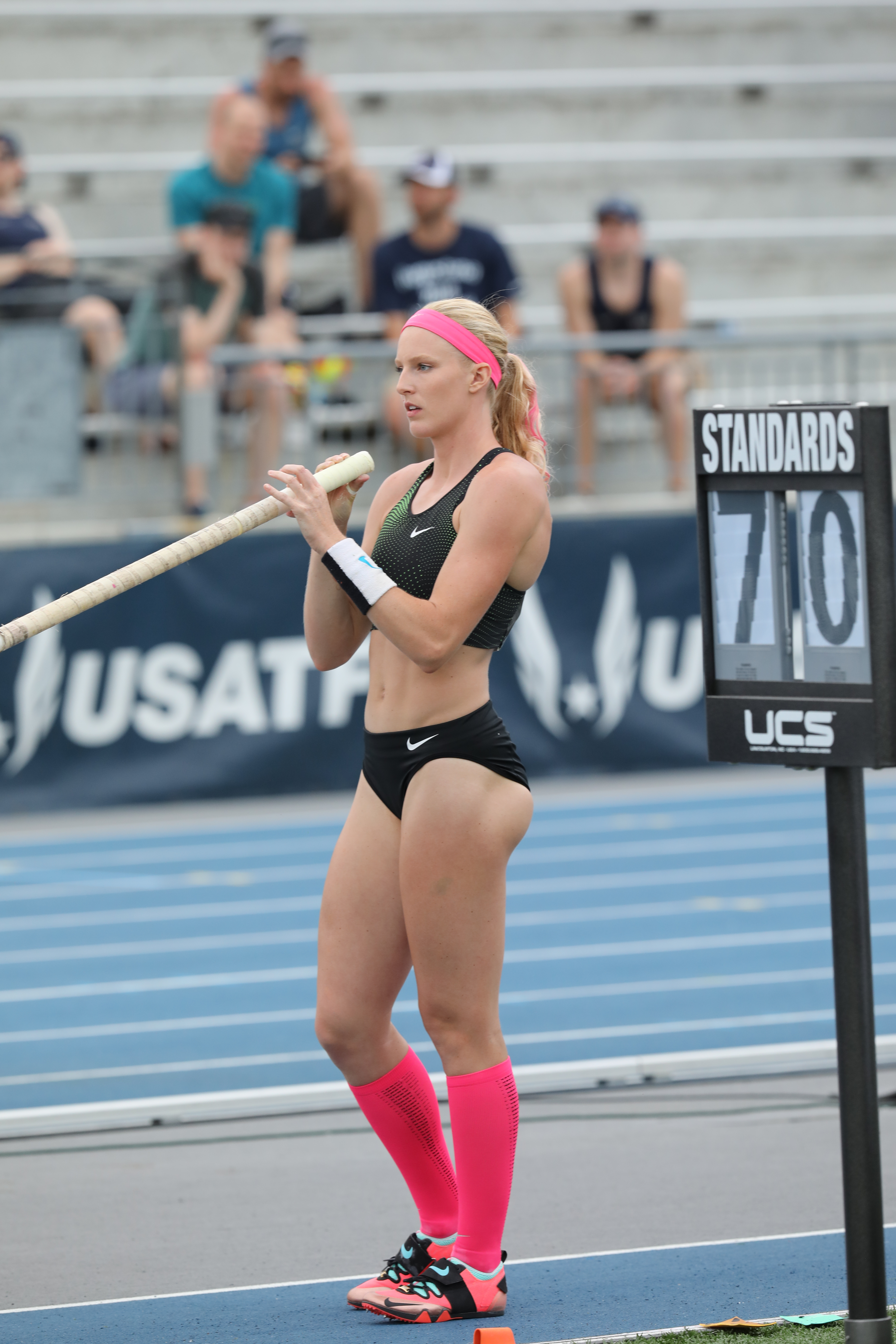
Sandi Morris at the 2018 USATF Championships in Des Moines, Iowa.

Morris has a personal best vault of 4.95 m (16 ft 3 in) indoor, set on March 12, 2016, in Portland, Oregon. She matched this height at the 2018 World Indoor Championships when setting a new championship record. July 23, 2016, Morris cleared 4.93 m (16 ft 2 in) at American Track League in Houston at Rice University breaking Jennifer Suhr's American outdoor record in the pole vault. Morris cleared 5.00 m (16 ft 5 in) at 2016 IAAF Diamond League Memorial Van Damme in Brussels on September 9, 2016, to set the U.S. women's outdoor pole vault record.

She won World Championship silver in London 2017 (4.75 m) and Doha 2019 (4.90 m). At the 2018 World Indoor Championships in Birmingham she won gold with a championship record of 4.95 m. She defended that indoor title in Belgrade in 2022 (4.80 m). Outdoors she added further World Championship silvers in Eugene 2022 (4.85 m) and Tokyo 2025 (4.85 m). At the delayed 2020 Olympics in Tokyo she did not reach the final (tied 16th, 4.40 m).

Morris has won multiple U.S. titles, including a tenth national title in 2026 with 4.90 m. At Weltklasse Zürich on August 26, 2026, in Zurich Main Station, she cleared 4.75 m and finished joint third with Katie Moon. Hana Moll (USA) won with 4.90 m; Angelica Moser (SUI) took second place with 4.85 m.

== Personal bests ==
Outdoor: 5.00 m NR — Brussels, September 9, 2016

Indoor: 4.95 m — Portland, March 12, 2016 (equalled in Birmingham, 2018)

== Personal life ==
Morris grew up in Greenville, South Carolina. She has been coached by Bryan Compton and has been married to long jumper Tyrone Smith since 2019.

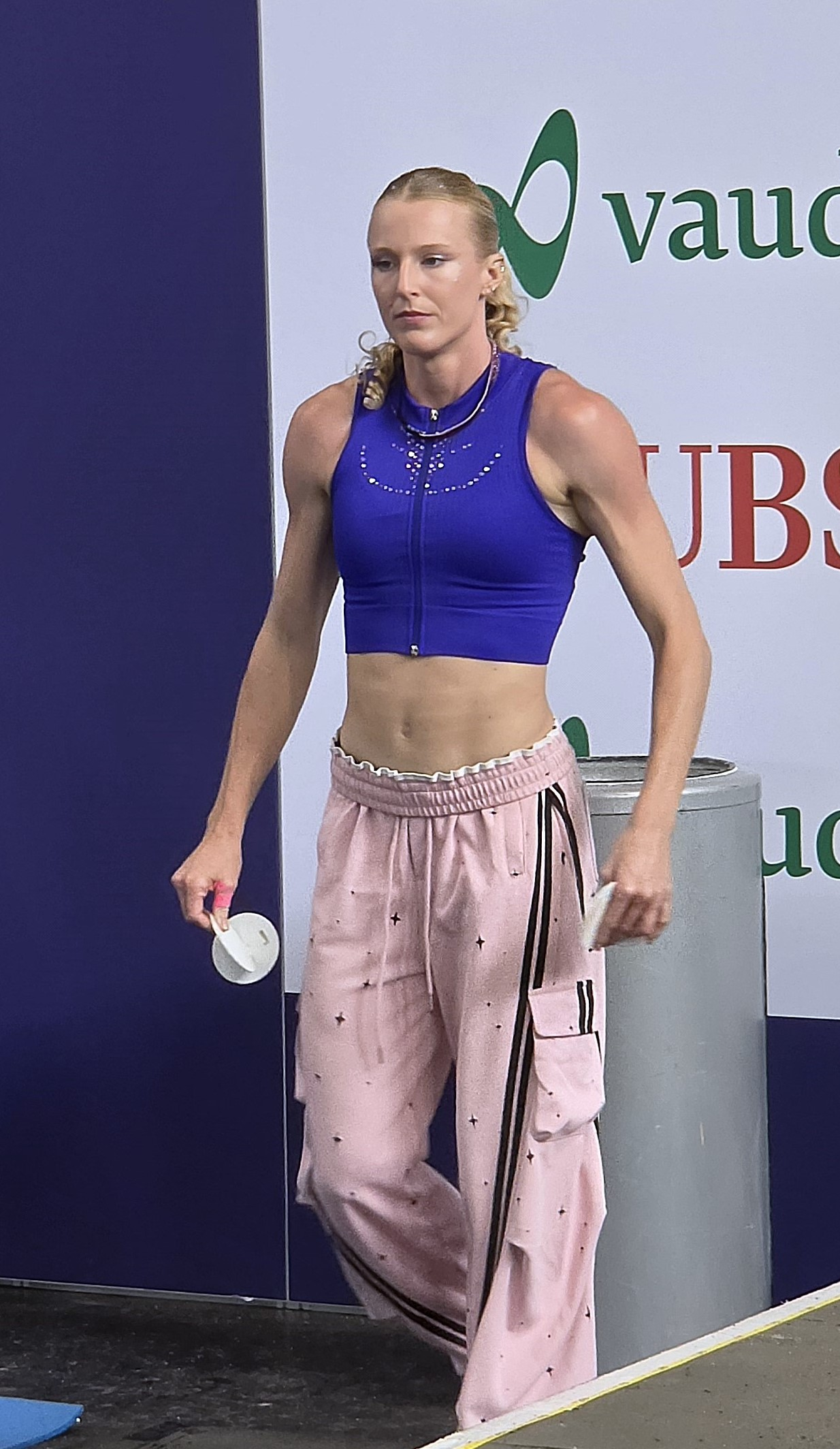
Sandi Morris in Zurich (2026).

Year	Competition	Venue	Position	Event	Result
Representing the United States
2025	World Championships	Tokyo, Japan	2nd	Pole Vault	4.85 m (15 ft 11 in)
2022	World Championships	Eugene, Oregon	2nd	Pole Vault	4.85 m (15 ft 11 in) WL
2022	World Indoor Championships	Belgrade, Serbia	1st	Pole Vault	4.80 m (15 ft 9 in)
2021	Olympic Games	Tokyo, Japan	T-16th	Pole Vault	4.40 m (14 ft 5 in)
2019	World Championships	Doha, Qatar	2nd	Pole Vault	4.90 m (16 ft 1 in)
2018	World Indoor Championships	Birmingham, United Kingdom	1st	Pole Vault	4.95 m (16 ft 3 in) CR
2017	World Championships	London, United Kingdom	2nd	Pole Vault	4.75 m (15 ft 7 in)
2016	Olympic Games	Rio de Janeiro, Brazil	2nd	Pole Vault	4.85 m (15 ft 11 in)
2016	World Indoor Championships	Portland, OR, United States	2nd	Pole Vault	4.85 m (15 ft 11 in)
2015	World Championships	Beijing, China	4th	Pole Vault	4.70 m (15 ft 5 in)
2014	NACAC U23 Championships	Kamloops, Canada	1st	Pole Vault	4.40 m (14 ft 5 in) CR
2011	Pan American U20 Championships	Miramar, FL, United States	2nd	Pole Vault	4.05 m (13 ft 3 in)
Representing Puma
2022	USATF Championships	Eugene, Oregon	1st	Pole Vault	4.82 m (15 ft 10 in)
2022	USATF Indoor Championships	Spokane, Washington	1st	Pole Vault	4.80 m (15 ft 9 in)
2021	US Olympic Trials	Eugene, Oregon	3rd	Pole Vault	4.60 m (15 ft 1 in)
Representing Nike
2020	USATF Indoor Championships	Albuquerque, New Mexico	1st	Pole Vault	4.90 m (16 ft 1 in)
2019	USATF Championships	Des Moines, Iowa	1st	Pole Vault	4.85 m (15 ft 11 in)
2018	USATF Championships	Des Moines, Iowa	1st	Pole Vault	4.80 m (15 ft 9 in)
2018	USATF Indoor Championships	Albuquerque, New Mexico	2nd	Pole Vault	4.86 m (15 ft 11 in)
2017	USATF Championships	Sacramento, California	1st	Pole Vault	4.80 m (15 ft 9 in)
2017	USATF Indoor Championships	Albuquerque, New Mexico	1st	Pole Vault	4.70 m (15 ft 5 in)
2016	US Olympic Trials	Eugene, Oregon	2nd	Pole Vault	4.75 m (15 ft 7 in)
2016	USATF Indoor Championships	Portland, Oregon	1st	Pole Vault	4.95 m (16 ft 3 in)
2015	USATF Championships	Eugene, Oregon	2nd	Pole Vault	4.65 m (15 ft 3 in)
Representing the Arkansas Razorbacks
2014	USATF Championships	Sacramento, California	2nd	Pole Vault	4.55 m (14 ft 11 in)
2014	USATF Indoor Championships	Albuquerque, New Mexico	4th	Pole Vault	4.51 m (14 ft 10 in)
Representing the North Carolina Tar Heels
2011	USATF U20 Championships	Eugene, Oregon	2nd	Pole Vault	4.15 m (13 ft 7 in)
Representing Greenville High School
2010	USATF Junior Olympics	Sacramento, California	1st	Pole Vault	4.05 m (13 ft 3 in)
2009	USATF Junior Olympics	Greensboro, North Carolina	5th	Pole Vault	3.55 m (11 ft 8 in)

Morris won 2017 Drake Relays Pole vault title in 4.72 m (15 ft 6 in).

== NCAA ==
Year	SEC indoor Track and Field Championships	NCAA indoor Track and Field Championships	SEC Outdoor Track and Field Championships	NCAA Outdoor Track and Field Championships
Representing the Arkansas Razorbacks
2015	4.66 m (15 ft 3 in) 1st	4.60 m (15 ft 1 in); 1st NCAA Record	4.72 m (15 ft 6 in) 1st	4.65 m (15 ft 3 in) 2nd
2014			4.50 m (14 ft 9 in) 1st	4.35 m (14 ft 3 in) 4th
2013	4.18 m (13 ft 9 in) 2nd	4.35 m (14 ft 3 in) 4th		
Representing the North Carolina Tar Heels
Year	ACC indoor	NCAA indoor	ACC Outdoor	NCAA Outdoor
2012	4.01 m (13 ft 2 in) 4th	4.20 m (13 ft 9 in) 11th	NH 4.00 m (13 ft 1 in)	4.15 m (13 ft 7 in) 11th
2011	4.05 m (13 ft 3 in) 4th	4.00 m (13 ft 1 in) 11th	3.95 m (13 ft 0 in) 3rd	

== High school ==
Morris won 2009 and 2010 South Carolina High School League 3A state pole vault titles. Morris is a graduate of Greenville High School where she was a record-setting pole vaulter and all-state volleyball player. Morris was inducted into the Greenville County, SC Schools Hall of Fame in 2021.

Year	Region 2	State Outdoor
2010	1st 3.35 m (11 ft 0 in)	1st 3.83 m (12 ft 7 in)
2009	1st 3.35 m (11 ft 0 in)	1st 3.65 m (12 ft 0 in)

== See also ==
- Five metres club
