= Roberta Bruni =

Italian pole vaulter (born 1994)

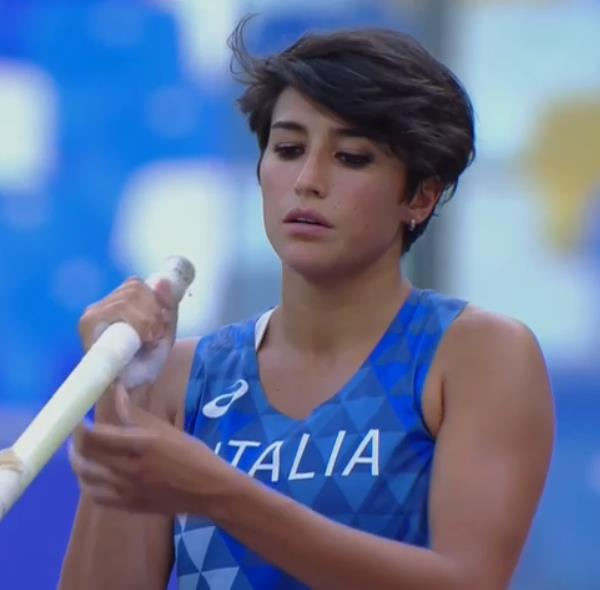
- Bruni in 2019

Personal information
- Nickname: Schiocchetto
- Born: 8 March 1994 (age 32) Rome, Italy
- Height: 1.70 m (5 ft 7 in)
- Weight: 54 kg (119 lb)

Sport
- Country: Italy
- Sport: Athletics
- Event: Pole vault
- Club: Atletica Studentesca Ca.Ri.Ri. C.S. Carabinieri

Achievements and titles
- Personal bests: Pole vault outdoor: 4.73 m (2023); Pole vault indoor: 4.70 m (2025)
Medal record
European Team Championships
Gold medal – first place	2021 Silesia	Pole vault
Universiade
Gold medal – first place	2019 Naples	Pole vault
World Junior Championships
Bronze medal – third place	2012 Barcelona	Pole vault
European Youth Olympic Festival
Gold medal – first place	2011 Trabzon	Pole vault

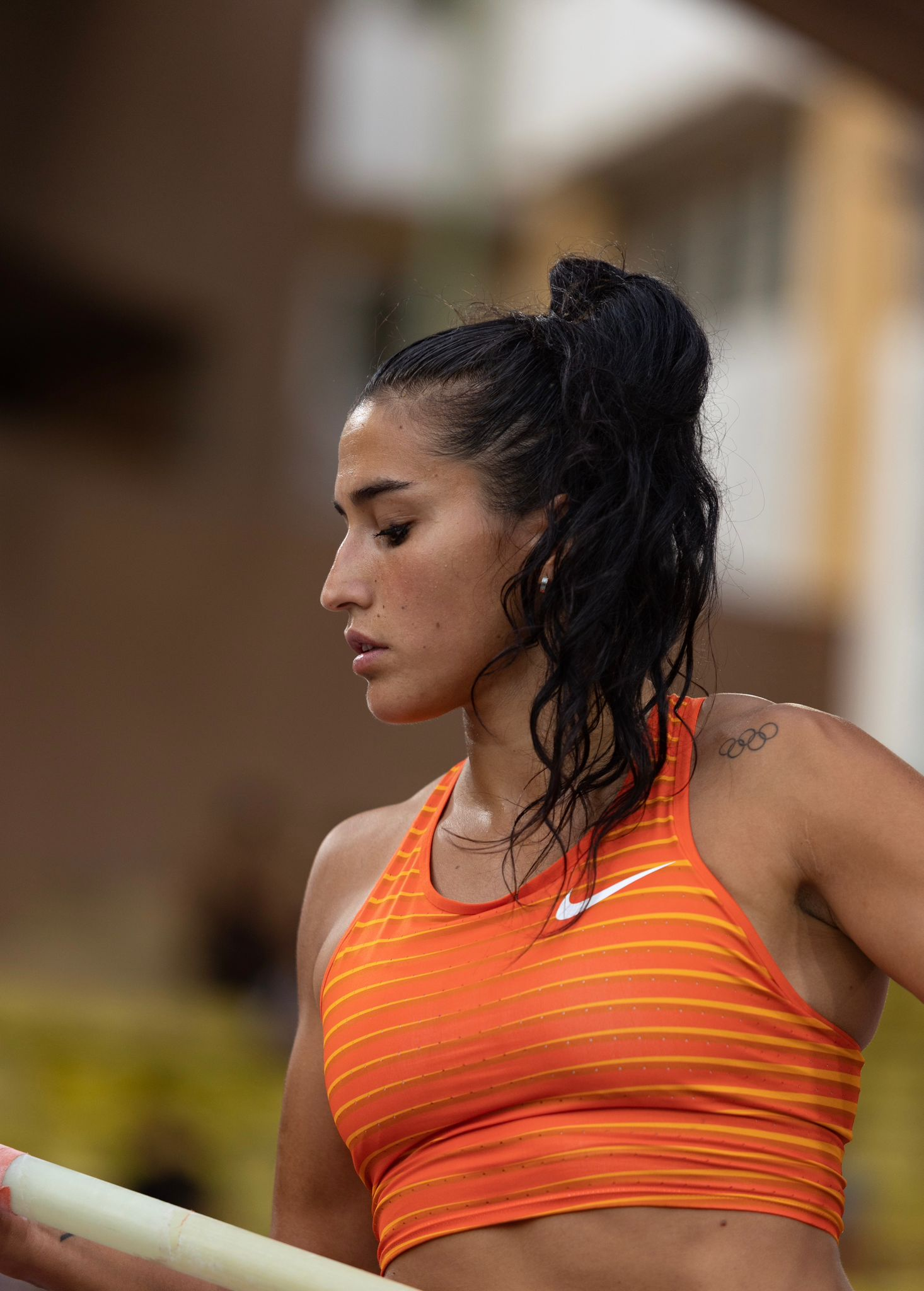
Bruni in 2022.

Roberta Bruni (born 8 March 1994) is an Italian pole vaulter. She competed at the 2020 Summer Olympics and 2024 Summer Olympics, in pole vault. Her personal best of 4.73 m is the Italian record for the event.

== Career ==
Her personal best indoor (4.60 m) is the second best junior performance of all-time after the world record of the Swedish Angelica Bengtsson, established at the 2013 Italian Athletics Indoor Championships.

Her height of 4.35 m established on 16 June 2012 in Misano Adriatico was the third best by a junior athlete that year. She is a friend of fellow Italian pole vaulter Giorgia Benecchi.

In 2021, she participated in the Tokyo Olympics, but failed to make it past the qualifying stages, stopping at 4.25m.

In 2022, she participated in the World Championships in Eugene and the European Championships in Munich. In Eugene, she failed to qualify for the final after jumping 4.35 m on her second attempt and failing to clear 4.50 m. In Monaco, she reached the final and finished the European championships in seventh place with a measure of 4.55 m, jumped on her third attempt.

In 2023, after a lower-than-expected World Championships in Budapest (in which she failed to pass the qualifying round), she set a new Italian record in Chiari on September 4, with a measure of 4.73 m.

== National records ==
- Pole vault outdoor: 4.73 m (Chiari, Italy, 4 September 2023) - Current holder
- Pole vault indoor: 4.70 m (Clermont-Ferrand, France, 28 February 2025) - Current holder

== Progression ==
Starting with the 2022 season – when World Athletics adopted the current World Rankings system – events such as pole vault, high jump, long jump, triple jump and shot put will have a single seasonal ranking, which includes both outdoor and indoor performances, rather than two separate lists.

Personal best

Year	Performance	Venue	Date	World Rank
2025	4.70 (i)	(France) Clermont-Ferrand	28 February	12
2024	4.66	Monaco	16 July	20
2023	4.73	(Italy) Chiari	4 September	13
2022	4.72	(Italy) Rovereto	30 August	11

Pole vault outdoor

Updated to 6 September 2023

Year	Performance	Venue	Date	World Rank Senior	World Rank U20	World Rank U18
2021	4.70	(Italy) Rieti	23 May	12th		
2020	4.30	(Italy) Rieti	23 July	52nd		
2019	4.52	(Italy) Chiari	2 September	37th		
2018	4.40	(Italy) Rieti	19 August	59th		
2017	4.25	(Italy) Rieti	27 May	115th		
2016	4.20	(Italy) Rieti	22 May	99th		
2015	4.25	(Italy) Turin	26 July	86th		
2014	4.45	(Italy) Rieti	31 July	36th		
2013	4.40	(Italy) Formia	30 May	54th	3rd	
2012	4.35	(Italy) Misano Adriatico	16 June	50th	4th	
2011	4.20	(Italy) Rieti	2 June	104th	11th	3rd
2010	3.85	(Italy) Rieti	3 October	367th	23rd	74th

Pole vault indoor

Year	Performance	Venue	Date	World Rank Senior	World Rank U20	World Rank U18
2021	4.41	(Italy) Ancona	21 February			
2020	season not disputed					
2019	4.40	(Italy) Ancona	17 February			
2018	4.35	(Italy) Florence	8 February			
2017	season not disputed					
2016	4.30	(Italy) Padua	22 February	76th		
2015	4.30	(Italy) Ancona	7 February	76th		
2014	season not disputed					
2013	4.60	(Italy) Ancona	17 February	8th	1st	
2012	4.25	(Italy) Fermo	28 January	76th	5th	
2011	3.20	(Italy) Fermo	29 January			

== Achievements ==
Junior level

Year	Competition	Venue	Rank	Event	Mesure	Notes
2011	World Youth Championships	(France) Lille	6th	Pole vault	4.00 m	
2011	European Youth Summer Olympic Festival	(Turkey) Trabzon	1st	Pole vault	4.10 m	CR
2012	World Junior Championships	(Spain) Barcelona	3rd	Pole vault	4.20 m	
2013	European Indoor Championships	(Sweden) Göteborg	12th (q)	Pole vault	4.36 m	
2013	European Junior Championships	(Italy) Rieti	5th	Pole vault	4.15 m	
2014	Mediterranean U23 Athletics Championships	(France) Aubagne	2nd	Pole vault	4.06 m	

Senior level

Year	Competition	Venue	Rank	Event	Mesure	Notes
2014	European Championships	(Switzerland) Zürich	22nd (q)	Pole vault	4.25 m	
2019	Universiade	(Italy) Naples	1st	Pole vault	4.46 m	GR
2019	World Championships	(Qatar) Doha	29th (q)	Pole vault	4.35 m	
2021	European Team Championships (SL)	(Poland) Chorzów	1st	Pole vault	4.45 m	
2021	Olympic Games	(Japan) Tokyo	24th (q)	Pole vault	4.25 m	
2022	World Indoor Championships	(Serbia) Belgrade	11th	Pole vault	4.30 m	
2022	World Championships	(United States) Eugene	16th (q)	Pole vault	4.35 m	
2022	European Championships	(Germany) Munich	7th	Pole vault	4.55 m	
2023	European Indoor Championships	(Turkey) Istanbul	8th	Pole vault	4.25 m	
2023	European Team Championships	(Poland) Chorzów	10th	Pole vault	4.40 m	
2023	World Championships	(Hungary) Budapest	29th (q)	Pole vault	4.35 m	
2024	World Indoor Championships	(United Kingdom) Glasgow	10th	Pole vault	4.40 m	
2024	European Championships	(Italy) Rome	7th	Pole vault	4.58 m	
2024	Olympic Games	(France) Paris	14th	Pole vault	4.40 m	
2025	European Indoor Championships	(Netherlands) Apeldoorn	5th	Pole vault	4.70 m	PB
2025	World Indoor Championships	(China) Nanjing	7th	Pole vault	4.60 m	
2025	World Championships	(Japan) Tokyo	11th	Pole vault	4.45 m	

== National titles ==
Bruni has won 12 national championships at individual senior level.

- Italian Athletics Championships
  - Pole vault: 2014, 2018, 2020, 2022, 2023, 2024 (5)
- Italian Athletics Indoor Championships
  - Pole vault: 2013, 2015, 2018, 2021, 2023, 2025 (6)

== See also ==
- List of Italian records in athletics
- Italian all-time lists - Pole vault
