= Olivia McTaggart =

New Zealand pole vaulter (born 2000)

Personal information
- Born: 9 January 2000 (age 26) Southport, Queensland, Australia
- Height: 1.71 m (5 ft 7 in)
- Relative: Cameron McTaggart (brother)

Sport
- Country: New Zealand
- Sport: Athletics
- Event: Pole vault
- Club: North Harbour Bays Athletics

Achievements and titles
- Personal best: 4.73 m

Olivia McTaggart (born 9 January 2000) is a New Zealand pole vault athlete.

== Early life ==
McTaggart was born in Australia to an Australian father and New Zealander mother. She later moved with her family to Greenhithe, in Auckland, New Zealand. She attended Kristin School.

== Career ==
McTaggart was a competitive gymnast for 10 years before changing to pole vaulting due to a back injury in 2014. After less than six months in the sport, she competed at the Australian Junior Championships in the under-16 event and won a bronze medal.

In 2017, McTaggart broke the New Zealand under-17 record previously held by Eliza McCartney. The height she cleared, 4.40m, placed her third in the world for under-18 athletes and seventh in the world for under-20 athletes. The same year she was a recipient of the AMP National Scholarship.

In 2018, she competed at the Commonwealth Games on the Gold Coast, Australia where she finished ninth with a clearance of 4.30m. Her brother Cameron also competed at the 2018 Commonwealth Games in the men's 77 kg division weightlifting. That year she also competed at the IAAF World U20 Championships in Tampere, Finland where she finished fifth in the final also with a clearance of 4.30m.

In 2019, McTaggart competed at the Universiade in Naples, Italy, where she finished fourth with a mark of 4.31m.

She represented NZ at the 2022 World Athletics Indoor Championships where she came sixth with a clearance of 4.60m.

She won the Diamond League London Athletics Meet on 19 July 2025 with a personal best of 4.73

== Personal bests ==
Outdoor

| Performance | Location | Date |
|---|---|---|
| 4.73m | London, United Kingdom | 19 July 2025 |

Indoor

| Performance | Location | Date |
|---|---|---|
| 4.65m | Birmingham, United Kingdom | 15 February 2025 |
