= Athletics at the 2026 Asian Games – Women's pole vault =

Women's pole vault at the 2026 Asian Games
- Venue: Mizuho Park Athletic Stadium, Nagoya
- Date: 25 September 2026
- Competitors: 10 from 7 nations

Medalists
gold medal	Misaki Morota	Japan
silver medal	Niu Chunge	China
bronze medal	Baranica Elangovan	India
bronze medal	Polina Ivanova	Kazakhstan

The women's pole vault competition at the 2026 Asian Games took place on 25 September 2026 at the Mizuho Park Athletic Stadium in Nagoya, Japan. Misaki Morota of Japan won the gold medal with a personal-best of 4.55 metres (14.9 ft), while Niu Chunge of China won the silver medal. Baranica Elangovan of India and Polina Ivanova of Kazakhstan shared the bronze medal. This was India's first ever medal in pole vault at the Asian Games.

== Schedule ==
All times are Japan Standard Time (UTC+09:00)

Schedule
Date	Time	Event
Friday, 25 September	16:33	Final

== Records ==
Prior to this competition, the existing world, Asian and Games records were as follows.

World Record	Yelena Isinbayeva (RUS)	5.06	Zürich, Switzerland	27 August 2009
Asian Record	Niu Chunge (CHN)	4.73	Bengbu, China	30 May 2026
Games Record	Li Ling (CHN)	4.63	Hangzhou, China	1 October 2023

== Results ==
Rank	Athlete	Height													Result	Notes
Rank	Athlete	3.45	3.65	3.85	4.00	4.15	4.25	4.35	4.40	4.45	4.50	4.55	4.60	4.61	Result	Notes
1st place, gold medalist(s)	Misaki Morota (JPN)	-	-	-	XO	O	O	XO	-	O	-	XO	-	XXX	4.55	PB
2nd place, silver medalist(s)	Niu Chunge (CHN)	-	-	-	-	-	O	-	O	-	O	-	XXX		4.50	
3rd place, bronze medalist(s)	Baranica Elangovan (IND)	-	-	O	O	XO	XXX								4.15	
3rd place, bronze medalist(s)	Polina Ivanova (KAZ)	-	-	O	O	XO	XXX								4.15	
5	Diva Renatta Jayadi (INA)	-	-	-	O	XX-	X								4.00	
5	Akari Osakaya (JPN)	-	-	O	O	XXX									4.00	
7	Anna Cherkashina (KAZ)	-	XO	XO	O	XXX									4.00	
8	Shin Soo-young (KOR)	-	O	XXX											3.65	
	Noreen Hussain (PAK)	XXR													NM	
	Sindhushree Ganesh (IND)	-	-	XX-	X										NM	
