= Athletics at the 2010 Asian Games – Women's pole vault =

Women's pole vault at the 2010 Asian Games
- Venue: Aoti Main Stadium
- Date: 24 November 2010
- Competitors: 7 from 6 nations

Medalists
gold medal	Li Caixia	China
silver medal	Li Ling	China
silver medal	Tomomi Abiko	Japan

The women's pole vault event at the 2010 Asian Games was held at the Aoti Main Stadium, Guangzhou, China on 24 November 2010.

== Schedule ==
All times are China Standard Time (UTC+08:00)

Date	Time	Event
Wednesday, 24 November 2010	17:00	Final

== Records ==
Prior to this competition, the existing world, Asian and Games records were as follows.

World Record	Yelena Isinbayeva (RUS)	5.06	Zurich, Switzerland	28 August 2009
Asian Record	Gao Shuying (CHN)	4.53	New York City, United States	2 June 2007
Games Record	Gao Shuying (CHN)	4.35	Busan, South Korea	9 October 2002

== Results ==
Legend

- NM — No mark

Rank	Athlete	Attempt						Result	Notes
Rank	Athlete	3.60	3.80	4.00	4.15	4.30	4.40	Result	Notes
1st place, gold medalist(s)	Li Caixia (CHN)	–	–	O	O	O	XXX	4.30	
2nd place, silver medalist(s)	Li Ling (CHN)	–	–	O	O	XO	XXX	4.30	
3rd place, bronze medalist(s)	Tomomi Abiko (JPN)	–	–	O	O	XXX		4.15	
4	Choi Yun-hee (KOR)	–	O	O	XO	XXX		4.15	
5	Roslinda Samsu (MAS)	–	–	XO	XXX			4.00	
6	Sukanya Chomchuendee (THA)	O	O	XXX				3.80	
—	Rachel Yang (SIN)	XXX						NM	
