= 2023 Asian Athletics Championships – Women's pole vault =

Women's pole vault at the 2023 Asian Athletics Championships
- Venue: National Stadium
- Location: Bangkok, Thailand
- Dates: 14 July
- Competitors: 11 from 7 nations
- Winning height: 4.66 m =CR

Medalists
gold medal	Li Ling	China
silver medal	Niu Chunge	China
bronze medal	Chayanisa Chomchuendee	Thailand

The women's pole vault event at the 2023 Asian Athletics Championships was held on 14 July.

== Records ==
Records before the 2023 Asian Athletics Championships
Record	Athlete (nation)	Height (m)	Location	Date
World record	Yelena Isinbayeva (RUS)	5.06	Zurich, Switzerland	28 August 2009
Asian record	Li Ling (CHN)	4.72	Shanghai, China	18 May 2019
Championship record	Li Ling (CHN)	4.66	Wuhan, China	6 June 2015
World leading	Katie Moon (UKR)	4.90	Eugene, United States	9 July 2023
Asian leading	Xu Huiqin (CHN)	4.63	Val-de-Reuil, France	4 February 2023

== Results ==
Rank	Name	Nationality	3.40	3.60	3.80	4.00	4.10	4.20	4.30	4.41	4.51	4.56	4.61	4.66	4.73	Result	Notes
1st place, gold medalist(s)	Li Ling	China	–	–	–	–	–	o	–	xxo	x–	xo	–	o	xx	4.66	=CR
2nd place, silver medalist(s)	Niu Chunge	China	–	–	–	–	–	–	o	–	xo	–	xxx			4.51	
3rd place, bronze medalist(s)	Chayanisa Chomchuendee	Thailand	–	–	xx–	o	o	xxx								4.10	
4	Misaki Morota	Japan	–	–	o	o	xxx									4.00	
5	Shen Yi-ju	Chinese Taipei	–	–	x–	xo	xxx									4.00	
6	Anastasiya Yermakova	Kazakhstan	–	–	o	xxx										3.80	
7	Megumi Dainobu	Japan	–	o	xo	xxx										3.80	
8	Chonthicha Khabut	Thailand	–	o	xxx											3.60	
9	Shin Soo-young	South Korea	o	xo	xxx											3.60	
10	Piyada Bunkwang	Thailand	o	xxx												3.40	
	Baranica Elangovan	India	–	–	xxx											NM	
