= 2011 Asian Athletics Championships – Women's pole vault =

Women's pole vault at the 2011 Asian Athletics Championships

The women's pole vault at the 2011 Asian Athletics Championships was held at the Kobe Universiade Memorial Stadium on 9 July.

== Results ==
| Rank | Athlete | Nationality | 3.60 | 3.75 | 3.90 | 4.00 | 4.10 | 4.20 | 4.30 | 4.35 | 4.40 | Result | Notes |
|---|---|---|---|---|---|---|---|---|---|---|---|---|---|
| 1st place, gold medalist(s) | Wu Sha | China | – | – | – | xo | – | xo | o | o | xxx | 4.35 | |
| 2nd place, silver medalist(s) | Li Ling | China | – | – | – | o | – | xxo | xo | – | xxx | 4.30 | |
| 3rd place, bronze medalist(s) | Choi Yun-hee | South Korea | – | – | – | o | – | xxx | | | | 4.00 | |
| 4 | Olga Lapina | Kazakhstan | – | o | xo | xo | xxx | | | | | 4.00 | |
| 5 | Miho Imano | Japan | o | xo | xxx | | | | | | | 3.75 | |
| | Tomomi Abiko | Japan | – | – | – | xx– | – | x | | | | NM | |
| | Rachel Yang | Singapore | xxx | | | | | | | | | NM | |
