= Athletics at the 2013 SEA Games – Women's pole vault =

The women's pole vault at the 2013 SEA Games, the athletics was held in Naypyidaw, Myanmar. The track and field events took place at the Wunna Theikdi Stadiumon December 15.

== Schedule ==
All times are Myanmar Standard Time (UTC+06:30)

Date	Time	Event
Sunday, 15 December 2013	14:00	Final

== Records ==
Prior to this competition, the existing world, Asian, and Southeast Asian Games records were as follows.

World Record	Yelena Isinbayeva (RUS)	5.06 m	Zürich, Switzerland	28 August 2009
Asian Record	Li Ling (CHN)	4.65 m	Shenyang, China	8 September 2013
Games Record	Roslinda Samsu (MAS)	4.20 m	Palembang, Indonesia	15 November 2011

== Results ==
Legend

- NM — No Mark

Rank	Athlete	Result	Notes
1st place, gold medalist(s)	Sukanya Chomchuendee (THA)	4.21	GR, NR
2nd place, silver medalist(s)	Le Thi Phuong (THA)	4.10	
3rd place, bronze medalist(s)	Riezel Buenaventura (PHI)	3.80	
4	Nanthaka Raksawai (THA)	3.50	
—	Hnin Yee Wai (MYA)	NM	
