= 2009 Asian Athletics Championships – Women's pole vault =

The women's pole vault event at the 2009 Asian Athletics Championships was held at the Guangdong Olympic Stadium on November 12.

== Results ==
Rank	Athlete	Nationality	3.60	3.80	4.00	4.15	4.30	4.45	Result	Notes
1st place, gold medalist(s)	Li Caixia	China	–	o	o	o	o	xxx	4.30	
2nd place, silver medalist(s)	Wu Sha	China	–	xo	xo	xxo	x		4.15	
3rd place, bronze medalist(s)	Choi Yun-hee	South Korea	–	o	xo	xxx			4.00	
4	Sureka Vazhapilli Sureshbabu	India	–	xxo	xxx				3.80	
5	Roslinda Samsu	Malaysia	xo	xxx					3.60	
	Takayo Kondo	Japan	–	xxx					NM	
	Jie Yang Rachel Bing	Singapore	xxx						NM	
	Kuan Mei-lien	Chinese Taipei	xxx						NM	
