= 2025 Asian Athletics Championships – Women's pole vault =

Women's pole vault at the 2025 Asian Athletics Championships
- Venue: Gumi Civic Stadium
- Location: Gumi, South Korea
- Dates: 28 May
- Competitors: 10 from 5 nations
- Winning height: 4.48 m

Medalists
| gold medal | Niu Chunge | China |
| silver medal | Xu Huiqin | China |
| bronze medal | Misaki Morota | Japan |

The women's pole vault event at the 2025 Asian Athletics Championships was held on 28 May.

== Records ==
Records before the 2025 Asian Athletics Championships
| Record | Athlete (nation) | Height (m) | Location | Date |
|---|---|---|---|---|
| World record | Yelena Isinbayeva (RUS) | 5.06 | Zurich, Switzerland | 28 August 2009 |
| Asian record | Li Ling (CHN) | 4.72 | Shanghai, China | 18 May 2019 |
| Championship record | Li Ling (CHN) | 4.66 | Wuhan, China | 6 June 2015 |
| World leading | Amanda Moll (USA) | 4.91 | Indianapolis, United States | 28 February 2025 |
| Asian leading | Niu Chunge (CHN) | 4.65 | Nanjing, China | 1 May 2025 |

== Schedule ==
The event schedule, in local time (UTC+9), was as follows:

| Date | Time | Round |
|---|---|---|
| 28 May | 17:10 | Final |

== Results ==
| Place | Athlete | Nation | 3.43 | 3.63 | 3.83 | 3.98 | 4.13 | 4.23 | 4.33 | 4.43 | 4.48 | 4.53 | 4.58 | Results | Notes |
|---|---|---|---|---|---|---|---|---|---|---|---|---|---|---|---|
| 1st place, gold medalist(s) | Niu Chunge | China | - | - | - | - | - | - | o | - | xo | - | -r | 4.48 m | |
| 2nd place, silver medalist(s) | Xu Huiqin | China | - | - | - | - | - | o | x- | -r | | | | 4.23 m | |
| 3rd place, bronze medalist(s) | Misaki Morota | Japan | - | - | - | o | xxo | xxx | | | | | | 4.13 m | |
| 4 | Chonthicha Khabut | Thailand | - | o | o | o | xxx | | | | | | | 3.98 m | |
| 4 | Diva Renatta Jayadi | Indonesia | - | - | o | o | xxx | | | | | | | 3.98 m | |
| 6 | Akari Osakaya | Japan | - | - | xxo | o | xxx | | | | | | | 3.98 m | |
| 7 | Maria Andriany | Indonesia | - | xo | o | xxx | | | | | | | | 3.83 m | SB |
| 8 | Jo Min-ji | South Korea | o | o | xxx | | | | | | | | | 3.63 m | |
| — | Lim Eun-ji | South Korea | - | - | xxx | | | | | | | | | NM | |
| — | Chayanisa Chomchuendee | Thailand | xxx | | | | | | | | | | | NM | |
