= 2013 Asian Athletics Championships – Women's pole vault =

The women's pole vault at the 2013 Asian Athletics Championships was held at the Shree Shiv Chhatrapati Sports Complex on 6 July.

== Results ==
Rank	Name	Nationality	3.60	3.80	3.90	4.00	4.10	4.15	4.20	4.30	4.40	4.50	4.54	Result	Notes
1st place, gold medalist(s)	Li Ling	China	–	–	–	–	xo	–	–	o	o	xo	o	4.54	CR
2nd place, silver medalist(s)	Ren Mengqian	China	–	–	–	o	–	–	o	o	o	xxx		4.40	
3rd place, bronze medalist(s)	Sukanya Chomchuendee	Thailand	o	o	o	xo	xxo	o	xxx					4.15	NR
4	Lim Eun-Ji	South Korea	–	xo	–	xo	xo	xxx						4.10	
4	Olga Lapina	Kazakhstan	–	o	–	xxo	xo	xxx						4.10	
6	Kanae Tatsuta	Japan	o	o	o	o	xxx							4.00	
7	Megumi Nakada	Japan	xxo	xo	o	xo	xxx							4.00	
8	Khyati Vakharia	India	o	o	o	xxx								3.90	
9	Sureka V.S.	India	o	xo	xxx									3.80	
