= Athletics at the 2022 Asian Games – Women's pole vault =

Women's pole vault at the 2022 Asian Games
- Venue: Hangzhou Olympic Expo Main Stadium
- Date: 2 October 2023
- Competitors: 11 from 9 nations

Medalists
gold medal	Li Ling	China
silver medal	Misaki Morota	Japan
bronze medal	Niu Chunge	China

The women's pole vault competition at the 2022 Asian Games took place on 2 October 2023 at the HOC Stadium, Hangzhou.

== Schedule ==
All times are China Standard Time (UTC+08:00)

Date	Time	Event
Monday, 2 October 2023	19:00	Final

== Records ==
Prior to this competition, the existing world, Asian and Games records were as follows.

World Record	Yelena Isinbayeva (RUS)	5.06	Zurich, Switzerland	28 August 2009
Asian Record	Li Ling (CHN)	4.72	Shanghai, China	18 May 2019
Games Record	Li Ling (CHN)	4.60	Jakarta, Indonesia	28 August 2018

== Results ==
Legend

- NM — No mark

Rank	Athlete	Attempt										Result	Notes
Rank	Athlete	3.40	3.60	3.80	4.00	4.10	4.20	4.30	4.40	4.48	4.53	Result	Notes
Rank	Athlete	4.58	4.63	4.73								Result	Notes
1st place, gold medalist(s)	Li Ling (CHN)	–	–	–	–	–	–	O	–	–	O	4.63	GR
1st place, gold medalist(s)	Li Ling (CHN)	–	O	XXX								4.63	GR
2nd place, silver medalist(s)	Misaki Morota (JPN)	–	–	O	O	O	O	O	O	O	XXX	4.48	
3rd place, bronze medalist(s)	Niu Chunge (CHN)	–	–	–	–	–	–	O	–	–	XXX	4.30	
4	Chayanisa Chomchuendee (THA)	–	–	O	O	O	O	XX–	X			4.20	
5	Anastassiya Ermakova (KAZ)	–	–	O	XO	XXO	XXX					4.10	
6	Pavithra Vengatesh (IND)	–	–	O	O	XXX						4.00	
7	Shen Yi-ju (TPE)	–	–	XO	O	XXX						4.00	
8	Chonthicha Khabut (THA)	–	XO	O	XXX							3.80	
9	Shin Soo-young (KOR)	–	O	XXX								3.60	
10	Rachel Yang (SGP)	O	XXX									3.40	
—	Nor Sarah Adi (MAS)	–	–	XXX								NM	
