= Athletics at the 2014 Asian Games – Women's pole vault =

Women's pole vault at the 2014 Asian Games
- Venue: Incheon Asiad Main Stadium
- Dates: 30 September 2014
- Competitors: 6 from 4 nations

Medalists
gold medal	Li Ling	China
silver medal	Tomomi Abiko	Japan
bronze medal	Lim Eun-ji	South Korea

The women's pole vault event at the 2014 Asian Games was held at the Incheon Asiad Main Stadium, Incheon, South Korea on 30 September.

== Schedule ==
All times are Korea Standard Time (UTC+09:00)

Date	Time	Event
Tuesday, 30 September 2014	18:30	Final

== Records ==
Prior to this competition, the existing world, Asian and Games records were as follows.

World Record	Yelena Isinbayeva (RUS)	5.06	Zurich, Switzerland	28 August 2009
Asian Record	Li Ling (CHN)	4.65	Shenyang, China	8 September 2013
Games Record	Gao Shuying (CHN)	4.35	Busan, South Korea	9 October 2002

== Results ==
Rank	Athlete	Attempt									Result	Notes
Rank	Athlete	3.75	3.90	4.05	4.15	4.25	4.35	4.40	4.45	4.50	Result	Notes
1st place, gold medalist(s)	Li Ling (CHN)	–	–	–	XO	–	O	–	–	XXX	4.35	=GR
2nd place, silver medalist(s)	Tomomi Abiko (JPN)	–	–	O	XO	XO	XXX				4.25	
3rd place, bronze medalist(s)	Lim Eun-ji (KOR)	–	–	XXO	O	XXX					4.15	
4	Choi Ye-eun (KOR)	–	XXO	O	XXX						4.05	
4	Xu Huiqin (CHN)	–	XXO	O	XXX						4.05	
6	Chayanisa Chomchuendee (THA)	O	O	XXX							3.90	
