= Eliza McCartney =

New Zealand pole vaulter (born 1996)

- McCartney at the 2026 Weltklasse Zürich

Personal information
- Born: 11 December 1996 (age 29) Auckland, New Zealand
- Height: 1.79 m (5 ft 10 in)

Sport
- Country: New Zealand
- Sport: Athletics
- Event: Pole vault
- Club: Takapuna Amateur Athletic and Harrier Club

Achievements and titles
- National finals: Pole vault champion (2015, 2016, 2017, 2023, 2024, 2025, 2026)
- Personal bests: Outdoor: 4.94 m (2018 AR); Indoor: 4.75 m (2018 AR)
Medal record
Women's athletics
Representing New Zealand
Olympic Games
Bronze medal – third place	2016 Rio de Janeiro	Pole vault
World Indoor Championships
Silver medal – second place	2024 Glasgow	Pole vault
Commonwealth Games
Gold medal – first place	2026 Glasgow	Pole vault
Silver medal – second place	2018 Gold Coast	Pole vault
World Junior Championships
Bronze medal – third place	2014 Eugene	Pole vault
Summer Universiade
Silver medal – second place	2015 Gwangju	Pole vault
- Updated on July 2026

Eliza McCartney (born 11 December 1996) is a New Zealand track and field athlete who competes in the pole vault and won the bronze medal in this event at the 2016 Summer Olympics. Her outdoor best of 4.94 m (16 ft 2 1/4 in) is the current New Zealand record and was the Oceania record holder until Nina Kennedy broke it in 2026. She is the outdoor world junior record holder at 4.64 m (15 ft 2 1/2 in) (her absolute junior record has since been passed indoors). She won the silver medal at the Summer Universiade in 2015. At the Commonwealth Games she won the silver medal in 2018, and the gold medal in 2026.

== Personal life ==
McCartney was born in Auckland, where she still lives in the seaside suburb of Devonport. Her father William McCartney previously competed in the high jump while her mother Donna Marshall previously competed as a gymnast. She has two younger brothers. She attended her local primary school and then Belmont Intermediate School and later moved onto Takapuna Grammar School, where she was in the same year as the singer-songwriter Lorde; the two played netball together. McCartney was most fond of netball growing up, with her height and agility giving her an advantage in playing defence. She played several other sports in her youth, including cross country running, basketball, touch rugby, squash, tennis, swimming, and water polo. Eventually, she moved onto track and field, being a successful high jumper in her early teens before beginning pole vaulting in 2011. McCartney studied physiology at the University of Auckland.

== Early career ==
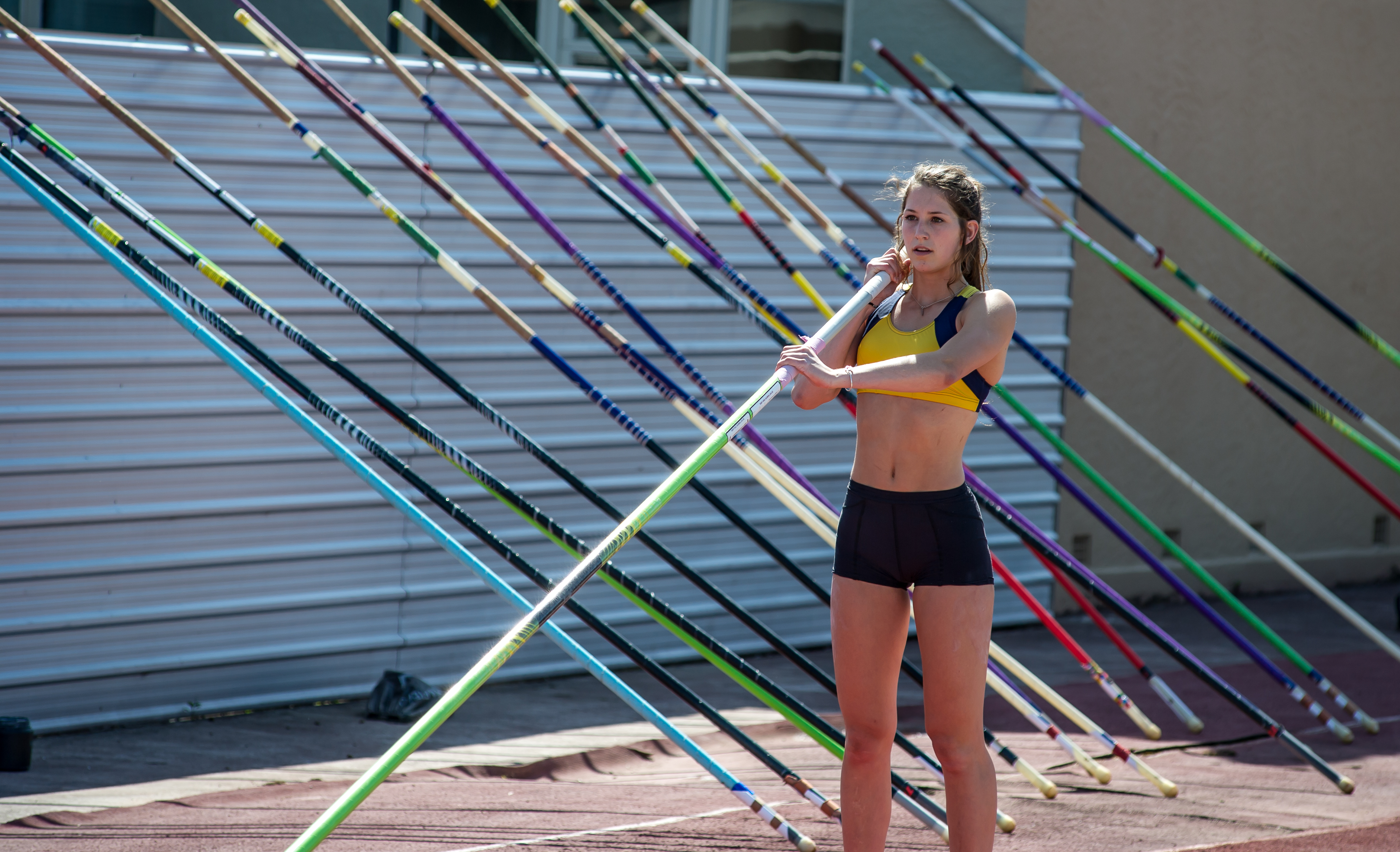
McCartney in December 2014

In 2011, at age 14, McCartney began pole vaulting. Her first coach was Jeremy McColl. In 2012, McCartney won the national youth (under 18) title and the New Zealand secondary school championship. The following year she broke the New Zealand youth record and was selected for the 2013 World Youth Championships in Athletics where she finished fourth.

In July 2014 McCartney took the bronze medal at the 2014 World Junior Championships in Athletics, with a vault of 4.45 m (14 ft 7 in) which was her first New Zealand national record. In 2015, she claimed her first senior national title at the New Zealand Athletics Championships and gained the silver medal at the Universiade with a height of 4.40 m (14 ft 5 in).

On 19 December 2015 McCartney set a world junior record of 4.64 m (15 ft 2 1/2 in) at Auckland's Mount Smart Stadium. On 17 January 2016 she vaulted 4.65 m (15 ft 3 in) in Brisbane, Australia, improving her own national senior and junior records (but not the world junior record). McCartney and McColl's long-term goal had been for her to compete at the 2020 Summer Olympics in Tokyo, but it became clear during 2015 that the 2016 Summer Olympics in Rio de Janeiro may already be a possibility.

On 23 February 2016, she jumped 4.71 m (15 ft 5 1/4 in) at the Vertical Pursuit international pole vault competition at Millennium Institute of Sport in Auckland, setting four new records: New Zealand national, New Zealand under 20, New Zealand resident, and New Zealand all comers. She was subsequently added to the New Zealand team to the 2016 IAAF World Indoor Championships

On 5 March 2016, she jumped 4.80 m (15 ft 8 3/4 in) at the national championships in Dunedin, to surpass her own New Zealand record. It is not clear whether or not this set a new Oceania record. The IAAF normally requires a minimum of three competitors in an event for a record to be ratified and in this case, there were only two. Regardless, the Oceanian record was broken later in July 2016 by Alana Boyd of Australia, with a jump of 4.81 m.

== International competition ==
McCartney made her senior international debut at the March 2016 IAAF World Indoor Championships in Portland, Oregon. She placed fifth with a vault of 4.70 m (15 ft 5 in), setting a new New Zealand indoor record.

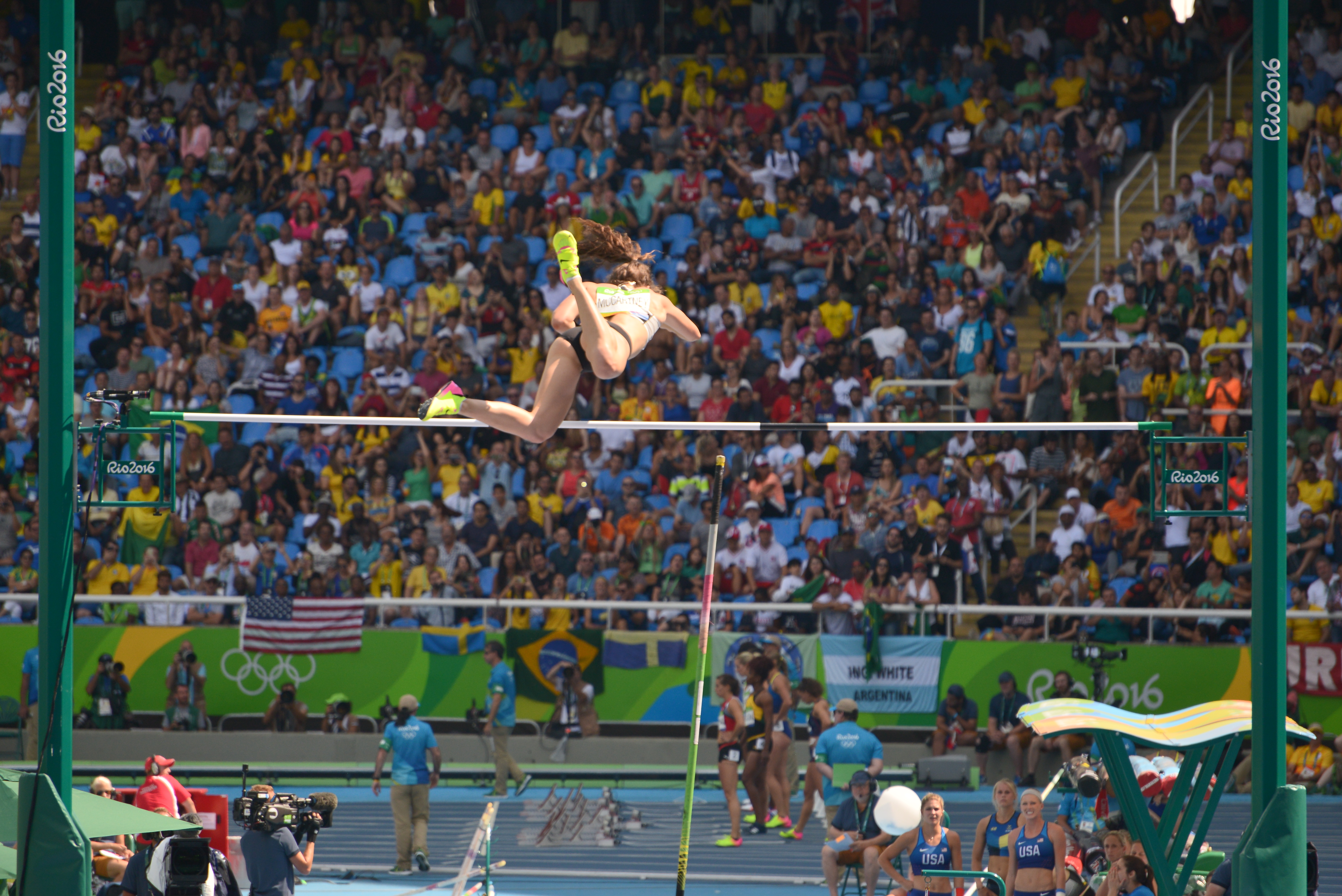
McCartney clears the bar during the women's pole vault qualifying round at the 2016 Summer Olympics.

In April 2016, McCartney was selected to compete at the 2016 Summer Olympics in Rio de Janeiro. In the Olympic final, she cleared 4.50 m, 4.60 m, 4.70 m, and her personal best 4.80 m on her first attempts, but was eliminated after failing to clear 4.85 m. Her 4.80 m result and no misses up to that height saw her place ahead of Australia's Alana Boyd to win the bronze medal. At age 19 years and 252 days, McCartney became the youngest Olympic medallist in the women's pole vault. She was also only the fourth New Zealand Olympic medallist in a field event, after Yvette Williams (long jump, 1952), Valerie Adams (shot put, 2008, 2012, 2016), and Tomas Walsh (shot put, 2016). BMX rider Sarah Walker, an Olympic silver medallist, approached McCartney at the Halberg Awards ceremony on 18 February 2016 and has been mentoring her since.

On 22 February 2017, McCartney equalled her indoor national record of 4.70 m (15 ft 5 in) at the Vertical Pursuit, held at Auckland's Britomart precinct. Four days later, she jumped a height of 4.82 m (15 ft 9 3/4 in) at the Auckland Track Challenge, breaking her own national record and the Oceanian record. On 26 May 2018, Mccartney again broke her national and Oceanian records when she jumped a height of 4.85 m (15 ft 10 3/4 in) at the Prefontaine Classic in Oregon.

On 24 June 2018, in Mannheim, Germany, she improved upon her personal best to 4.86. A few minutes later, she improved it again to 4.92. The 4.92 ranks her as the fourth highest female vaulter in history. On 18 July 2018, at a "street vault" in Jockgrim, Germany, McCartney cleared 4.94m. The vault was a new National and Oceania record and the #1 vault in the world in 2018.

In her first competition of 2019, McCartney cleared 4.85 m at the Potts Classic, breaking her New Zealand resident record.

== Injury issues ==
After competing in the 2016 Olympics, McCartney began to repeatedly suffer leg injuries. A heel injury during the 2018 Diamond League competition ended her season early. An achilles tendon injury in March 2021 prevented her from competing in the Tokyo Olympics. The same injury prevented McCartney from competing in the 2022 Commonwealth Games.

In 2020 tests suggested McCartney had a genetic disorder that predisposed her to autoimmune inflammation, particularly affecting tendons. Her training was adjusted to minimize and control the impacts and loads of her jumps to her lower legs. The careful adjustments, with lengthy periods of rest to allow healing, alleviated the issue.

== Return to competition ==
McCartney won a silver medal at the 2024 World Athletics Indoor Championships in Glasgow, Scotland, clearing 4.80 m but losing out on gold to Britain's Molly Caudery on count back. In 2024, she gained a place on the New Zealand Olympics team for the 2024 Olympics in Paris, placing 6th with a height of 4.70 m.

== Awards and recognition ==
McCartney won the Emerging Talent category of New Zealand's Halberg Awards for 2015 at an awards ceremony held on 18 February 2016. The year before, she was a finalist in the Halberg Awards Emerging Talent category, which was won by cyclist Regan Gough.

McCartney's 4.80 m vault that won her the Olympic bronze medal was voted New Zealand's Favourite Sporting Moment at the Halberg Awards for 2016.

== Sponsorship and advertising work ==
In October 2016, McCartney became an ambassador for Beef and Lamb New Zealand, joining existing athlete ambassadors Lisa Carrington, Sophie Pascoe, and Sarah Walker. Also in October 2016, McCartney became a brand ambassador for Blueberries NZ. In December 2016, McCartney featured alongside several other notable New Zealanders in an aircraft safety video for Air New Zealand, entitled Summer of Safety. In June 2021, McCartney became the Hyundai NZ Electric Vehicle ambassador.

== Statistics ==
=== Personal bests ===
Event	Height	Date	Location
Pole vault (outdoor)	4.94 m AR	23 June 2018	Mannheim, Germany
Pole vault (indoor)	4.75 m NR	3 March 2018	Birmingham, United Kingdom
High jump	1.73 m		Auckland, New Zealand

=== Pole vault annual progression ===
Year	Performance	Competition	Location	Date	World ranking
2011	3.60 m	New Zealand Secondary Schools Championships	Wellington, New Zealand	10 December	–
2012	3.85 m	New Zealand Secondary Schools Championships	Dunedin, New Zealand	8 December	–
2013	4.11 m	Greater Auckland Secondary Schools Championships	Auckland, New Zealand	26 March	–
2014	4.45 m	World Junior Championships	Eugene (OR), United States	24 July	36=
2015	4.64 m	Summer Series 7	Auckland, New Zealand	19 December	19
2016	4.80 m	New Zealand National Championships	Dunedin, New Zealand	5 March	9
2016	4.80 m	Olympic Games	Rio de Janeiro, Brazil	19 August	9
2017	4.82 m	Auckland Track Challenge	North Shore, New Zealand	26 February	4
2018	4.94 m	Stabhochsprung	Jockgrim, Germany	17 July	

=== International competitions ===
Year	Competition	Venue	Position	Event	Notes
2013	World Youth Championships	Donetsk, Ukraine	4th	Pole vault	4.05 m
2014	World Junior Championships	Eugene, United States	3rd	Pole vault	4.45 m NR
2015	Universiade	Gwangju, South Korea	2nd	Pole vault	4.40 m
2016	World Indoor Championships	Portland, United States	5th	Pole vault	4.70 m NR
2016	Olympic Games	Rio de Janeiro, Brazil	3rd	Pole vault	4.80 m NR
2017	World Championships	London, United Kingdom	9th	Pole vault	4.55 m
2018	World Indoor Championships	Birmingham, United Kingdom	4th	Pole vault	4.75 m
2018	Commonwealth Games	Gold Coast, Australia	2nd	Pole vault	4.70 m
2023	World Championships	Budapest, Hungary	–	Pole vault	NM
2024	World Indoor Championships	Glasgow, United Kingdom	2nd	Pole vault	4.80 m
2024	Olympic Games	Paris, France	6th	Pole vault	4.70 m
2025	World Championships	Tokyo, Japan	7th (q)	Pole vault	4.60 m^{1}
2026	World Indoor Championships	Toruń, Poland	6th	Pole vault	4.70 m
2026	Commonwealth Games	Glasgow, United Kingdom	1st	Pole vault	4.65 m
2026	World Ultimate Championship	Budapest, Hungary	5th	Pole vault	4.80 m

^{1}No mark in the final

=== National titles ===
- New Zealand National Track & Field Championships
  - Pole vault: 2015, 2016, 2017

== Notes ==
1. An Athletics New Zealand resident record is the best performance by a New Zealander in New Zealand.

Awards
Preceded by Regan Gough	Halberg Awards – Emerging Talent Award; 2015	Succeeded by Campbell Stewart
