= Athletics at the 2015 Summer Universiade – Women's pole vault =

The women's pole vault event at the 2015 Summer Universiade was held on 8 and 9 July at the Gwangju Universiade Main Stadium.

== Medalists ==
| Gold | Silver | Bronze |
|---|---|---|
| Li Ling; China | Eliza McCartney; New Zealand | Chloé Henry; Belgium |

== Results ==
=== Qualification ===
Qualification: 5.30 m (Q) or at least 12 best (q) qualified for the final.

| Rank | Group | Athlete | Nationality | 3.40 | 3.60 | 3.75 | 3.85 | 3.95 | 4.05 | Result | Notes |
|---|---|---|---|---|---|---|---|---|---|---|---|
| 1 | A | Anna Felzmann | Germany | – | – | – | – | o | o | 4.05 | q |
| 1 | A | Li Ling | China | – | – | – | – | – | o | 4.05 | q |
| 1 | A | Eliza McCartney | New Zealand | – | – | – | o | – | o | 4.05 | q |
| 1 | A | Olga Mullina | Russia | – | – | – | – | – | o | 4.05 | q |
| 1 | B | Chloé Henry | Belgium | – | – | – | – | – | o | 4.05 | q |
| 1 | B | Romana Maláčová | Czech Republic | – | – | – | – | – | o | 4.05 | q |
| 1 | B | Martina Schultze | Germany | – | – | – | – | – | o | 4.05 | q |
| 1 | B | Tatyana Shvydkina | Russia | – | – | – | – | – | o | 4.05 | q |
| 9 | A | Gina Reuland | Luxembourg | – | – | – | – | xo | o | 4.05 | q |
| 10 | B | Choi Ye-eun | South Korea | – | – | – | xo | – | xxo | 4.05 | q |
| 11 | B | Marta Onofre | Portugal | – | – | – | – | o | xxx | 3.95 | q |
| 12 | A | Ida Beate Østhus | Norway | o | o | xo | xo | o | xxx | 3.95 | q |
| 12 | B | Katrine Haarklau | Norway | – | – | – | xxo | o | xxx | 3.95 | q |
| 14 | A | Fanny Berglund | Sweden | – | – | o | o | xo | xxx | 3.95 | |
| 15 | A | Alexandra Wasik | United States | – | – | – | xxo | xxx | | 3.85 | |
| 15 | B | Chayanisa Chomchuendee | Thailand | – | – | o | xxo | – | xxx | 3.85 | |
| 17 | A | Lindsey Bergevin | Canada | – | – | o | – | xxx | | 3.75 | |
| | A | Noelina Madarieta | Argentina | – | – | – | xxx | | | NM | |
| | A | Tiina Tikk | Estonia | xxx | | | | | | NM | |
| | B | Klarika Kaldmaa | Estonia | xxx | | | | | | NM | |
| | B | Karleigh Parker | Canada | – | – | – | xxx | | | NM | |
| | B | Theresia Vangborg-Nyberg | Sweden | xxx | | | | | | NM | |

=== Final ===
Official Video

| Rank | Athlete | Nationality | 3.40 | 3.60 | 3.75 | 3.85 | 3.95 | 4.05 | 4.15 | 4.25 | 4.30 | 4.35 | 4.40 | 4.45 | 4.50 | Result | Notes |
|---|---|---|---|---|---|---|---|---|---|---|---|---|---|---|---|---|---|
| 1st place, gold medalist(s) | Li Ling | China | – | – | – | – | – | – | o | – | o | – | xo | o | xxx | 4.45 | |
| 2nd place, silver medalist(s) | Eliza McCartney | New Zealand | – | – | – | – | – | xxo | – | xo | o | xxo | o | x– | xx | 4.40 | SB |
| 3rd place, bronze medalist(s) | Chloé Henry | Belgium | – | – | – | – | – | o | o | xo | – | o | xxo | – | xxx | 4.40 | SB |
| 4 | Olga Mullina | Russia | – | – | – | – | – | – | o | o | – | o | xxx | | | 4.35 | |
| 5 | Tatyana Shvydkina | Russia | – | – | – | – | – | – | o | xo | – | xo | xxx | | | 4.35 | |
| 6 | Romana Maláčová | Czech Republic | – | – | – | – | – | – | o | o | – | xxx | | | | 4.25 | |
| 7 | Anna Felzmann | Germany | – | – | – | – | – | – | xo | o | – | xxx | | | | 4.25 | |
| 8 | Marta Onofre | Portugal | – | – | – | – | – | o | xo | xxx | | | | | | 4.15 | |
| 9 | Katrine Haarklau | Norway | – | – | – | – | o | o | xxx | | | | | | | 4.05 | |
| 9 | Ida Beate Østhus | Norway | o | o | o | o | o | o | xxx | | | | | | | 4.05 | SB |
| 9 | Gina Reuland | Luxembourg | – | – | – | – | – | o | xxx | | | | | | | 4.05 | |
| 12 | Choi Ye-eun | South Korea | – | – | – | xo | – | xxx | | | | | | | | 3.95 | |
| | Martina Schultze | Germany | – | – | – | – | – | xxx | | | | | | | | NM | |
