= Zhou Yang =

Zhou Yang may refer to:

People surnamed Zhou

- Zhou Yang (literary theorist) (1908–1989), Chinese literary theorist and Marxist thinker
- Zhou Yang (footballer) (born 1971), Chinese female association footballer
- Zhou Yang (actress) (born 1985), Chinese actress
- Zhou Yang (pole vaulter) (born 1988), Chinese pole vaulter
- Zhou Yang (speed skater) (born 1991), Chinese short track speed skater

People surnamed Yang

- Yang Zhou (born 1992), Chinese volleyball player
