= Athletics at the 2018 Asian Games – Women's pole vault =

Women's pole vault at the 2018 Asian Games
- Venue: Gelora Bung Karno Stadium
- Date: 28 August 2018
- Competitors: 6 from 5 nations

Medalists
gold medal	Li Ling	China
silver medal	Chayanisa Chomchuendee	Thailand
bronze medal	Lim Eun-ji	South Korea

The women's pole vault competition at the 2018 Asian Games took place on 28 August 2018 at the Gelora Bung Karno Stadium.

== Schedule ==
All times are Western Indonesia Time (UTC+07:00)

Date	Time	Event
Tuesday, 28 August 2018	18:35	Final

== Records ==
Prior to this competition, the existing world, Asian and Games records were as follows.

World Record	Yelena Isinbayeva (RUS)	5.06	Zurich, Switzerland	28 August 2009
Asian Record	Li Ling (CHN)	4.70	Doha, Qatar	19 February 2016
Games Record	Gao Shuying (CHN); Li Ling (CHN)	4.35	Busan, South Korea; Incheon, South Korea	9 October 2002; 30 September 2014

== Results ==
Rank	Athlete	Attempt										Result	Notes
Rank	Athlete	3.55	3.70	3.85	4.00	4.10	4.20	4.30	4.40	4.50	4.55	Result	Notes
Rank	Athlete	4.60	4.65	4.71								Result	Notes
1st place, gold medalist(s)	Li Ling (CHN)	–	–	–	–	–	O	O	XXO	–	–	4.60	GR
1st place, gold medalist(s)	Li Ling (CHN)	XXO	–	XXX								4.60	GR
2nd place, silver medalist(s)	Chayanisa Chomchuendee (THA)	–	–	O	O	O	O	O	XXX			4.30	
3rd place, bronze medalist(s)	Lim Eun-ji (KOR)	–	–	–	O	O	XXO	–	XXX			4.20	
4	Shen Yi-ju (TPE)	–	O	O	X–	O	XXX					4.10	
5	Wu Chia-ju (TPE)	–	O	XXX								3.70	
6	Diva Renatta Jayadi (INA)	XXO	XXX									3.55	
