= 2015 Asian Athletics Championships – Women's pole vault =

The women's pole vault event at the 2015 Asian Athletics Championships was held on June 6.

== Results ==
| Rank | Name | Nationality | 3.85 | 4.00 | 4.10 | 4.20 | 4.30 | 4.40 | 4.55 | 4.66 | Result | Notes |
|---|---|---|---|---|---|---|---|---|---|---|---|---|
| 1st place, gold medalist(s) | Li Ling | China | – | – | – | xo | – | o | xo | xo | 4.66 | AR |
| 2nd place, silver medalist(s) | Xu Huiqin | China | – | – | o | – | o | xxx | | | 4.30 | |
| 3rd place, bronze medalist(s) | Tomomi Abiko | Japan | – | o | – | o | xxx | | | | 4.20 | |
| 4 | Choi Ye-eun | South Korea | o | xo | xo | xo | xxx | | | | 4.20 | |
| 5 | Ren Mengqian | China | – | – | xo | – | xxx | | | | 4.10 | |
| | Rachel Yang | Singapore | | | | | | | | | DNS | |
