= 2019 Asian Athletics Championships – Women's pole vault =

Women's pole vault at the 2019 Asian Athletics Championships
- Venue: Khalifa International Stadium
- Location: Doha, Qatar
- Dates: 23 April
- Competitors: 9 from 6 nations
- Winning height: 4.61 m

Medalists
gold medal	Li Ling	China
silver medal	Xu Huiqin	China
bronze medal	Natalie Uy	Philippines

The women's pole vault at the 2019 Asian Athletics Championships was held on 23 April.

== Records ==
Records before the 2019 Asian Athletics Championships
Record	Athlete (nation)	Height (m)	Location	Date
World record	Yelena Isinbayeva (RUS)	5.06	Zurich, Switzerland	28 August 2009
Asian record	Li Ling (CHN)	4.70	Doha, Qatar	19 February 2016
Championship record	Li Ling (CHN)	4.66	Wuhan, China	6 June 2015
World leading	Anzhelika Sidorova (ANA)	4.91	Madrid, Spain	8 February 2019
Asian leading	Li Ling (CHN)	4.63	Szczecin, Poland	12 February 2019

== Results ==
Rank	Name	Nationality	3.60	3.80	4.00	4.10	4.20	4.30	4.36	4.46	4.51	4.61	4.71	Result	Notes
1st place, gold medalist(s)	Li Ling	China	–	–	–	–	–	o	–	o	–	xxo	xxx	4.61	SB
2nd place, silver medalist(s)	Xu Huiqin	China	–	–	–	–	xo	–	xo	–	xxx			4.36	SB
3rd place, bronze medalist(s)	Natalie Uy	Philippines	–	o	xo	o	o	xxx						4.20	
4	Lim Eun-ji	South Korea	–	xo	xxo	xxo	xxx							4.10	
5	Shen Yi-ju	Chinese Taipei	–	o	xxo	–	xxx							4.00	=SB
5	Rena Tanaka	Japan	o	o	xxo	xxx								4.00	
7	Wu Chia-ju	Chinese Taipei	o	xo	xxo	xxx								4.00	SB
8	Alyana Nicolas	Philippines	–	o	xxx									3.80	
9	Mahsa Mirzatebibi	Iran	o	xxx										3.60	
