= 2006 World Junior Championships in Athletics – Women's pole vault =

The women's pole vault event at the 2006 World Junior Championships in Athletics was held in Beijing, China, at Chaoyang Sports Centre on 16 and 18 August.

== Medalists ==
Gold	Zhou Yang; China
Silver	Tina Šutej; Slovenia
Bronze	Vicky Parnov; Australia

== Results ==
=== Final ===
18 August

Rank	Name	Nationality	Result	Notes
1st place, gold medalist(s)	Zhou Yang	China	4.30	
2nd place, silver medalist(s)	Tina Šutej	Slovenia	4.25	
3rd place, bronze medalist(s)	Vicky Parnov	Australia	4.20	
4	Valeriya Volik	Russia	4.10	
5	Chloé Mourand	France	4.10	
6	Minna Nikkanen	Finland	4.10	
7	Tomomi Abiko	Japan	4.00	
8	Tori Anthony	United States	3.90	
9	Gabriella Duclos-Lasnier	Canada	3.90	
10	Elena Scarpellini	Italy	3.80	
	Li Ling	China	NH	
	Lisa Ryjikh	Germany	NH	

=== Qualifications ===
16 August

==== Group A ====
Rank	Name	Nationality	Result	Notes
1	Li Ling	China	4.00	Q
2	Minna Nikkanen	Finland	4.00	Q
2	Tori Anthony	United States	4.00	Q
4	Vicky Parnov	Australia	4.00	Q
4	Lisa Ryjikh	Germany	4.00	Q
4	Tina Šutej	Slovenia	4.00	Q
7	Giulia Cargnelli	Italy	3.90	
8	Alexandra González	Puerto Rico	3.80	
9	Romana Maláčová	Czech Republic	3.80	
10	Daniela Höllwarth	Austria	3.80	
11	Iben Høgh-Pedersen	Denmark	3.80	
12	Leah Vause	Canada	3.70	
13	Marion Buisson	France	3.70	

==== Group B ====
Rank	Name	Nationality	Result	Notes
1	Zhou Yang	China	4.00	Q
1	Elena Scarpellini	Italy	4.00	Q
1	Valeriya Volik	Russia	4.00	Q
4	Chloé Mourand	France	4.00	Q
5	Tomomi Abiko	Japan	4.00	Q
6	Gabriella Duclos-Lasnier	Canada	3.95	q
7	Charmaine Lucock	Australia	3.90	
8	Emelie Gustafsson	Sweden	3.80	
9	Christina Michel	Germany	3.80	
10	Stélla-Iró Ledaki	Greece	3.80	
11	Brittany Parker	United States	3.80	
	Yarisley Silva	Cuba	NH	

== Participation ==
According to an unofficial count, 25 athletes from 18 countries participated in the event.

- Australia (2)
- Austria (1)
- Canada (2)
- China (2)
- Cuba (1)
- Czech Republic (1)
- Denmark (1)
- Finland (1)
- France (2)
- Germany (2)
- Greece (1)
- Italy (2)
- Japan (1)
- Puerto Rico (1)
- Russia (1)
- Slovenia (1)
- Sweden (1)
- United States (2)
