= Tori Anthony =

American pole vaulter (born 1989)

Tori Anthony (born April 19, 1989) is an American pole vaulter from Woodside, California and the holder of the national indoor and outdoor records for high school women at 14 ft 2 1/2 in (4.33 m) and 14 ft 1 in (4.29 m) respectively.

She was originally a gymnast, but burned out on the sport and switched to track and water polo. Competing in her first track events as a sophomore, she placed fourth in the pole vault at the 2005 CIF California State Meet within four months of taking up the sport. Even before setting the outdoor record, she was named an "Athletes Only" indoor track athlete of the year for 2006–07, and named "best high school girl pole vaulter in the country" by Sports Illustrated. She missed her high school graduation from Castilleja School to set the outdoor record on June 2, 2007. She competed for UCLA, achieving 13' 9" in their uniform to rank number in school history.

She was a two-time champion at the USA Junior Outdoor Track & Field Championships, winning in 2006 and 2007. She represented her country internationally at the 2006 World Junior Championships in Athletics (placing eighth in the final) and came fourth at the 2007 Pan American Junior Athletics Championships the following year. In senior national competition she was 11th at the 2007 USA Indoor Track and Field Championships and ninth at the 2007 USA Outdoor Track and Field Championships. She achieved her personal record 4.33 m (14 ft 2 1/4 in) that year. She retired from competition in 2012 after suffering injuries.

== International competitions ==
Year	Competition	Venue	Position	Event	Notes
2006	World Junior Championships	Beijing, China	8th	Pole vault	3.90 m
2007	Pan American Junior Championships	São Paulo, Brazil	4th	Pole vault	4.00 m
