= Sindhushree Ganesh =

Indian pole vaulter (born 2001)

Sindhushree Ganesh (born 2001) is an Indian polevaulter from Karnataka. She qualified to represent India in pole vault event at the 2026 Asian Games at Nagoya, Aichi Prefecture, Japan from 19 September to 4 October 2026.

She is from Bhadravati, Shivamogga district, Karnataka. Her father Ganesh, who inspired her to take up sports, passed away in 2022. He was an electrician and her mother does tailoring jobs or as a house help to run the family. She has an younger sister. Initially a 400m runner, she shifted to polevault as a trainee at the Sports Authority of India Centre in Bengaluru following a suggestion from her coach Vijeesh Kumar in 2017. She joined the SAI hostel in 2016.

== Career ==
Ganesh qualified for the Asian Games at the 65th National Inter-State Senior Athletics Championship held at Bhubaneswar in June 2026, where she created a new Indian National record with a 4.25 metre jump. She broke the previous record of 4.23m held by Baranica Elangovan, who has also qualified for the Asian Games.

In 2023, she won a silver medal in the National Inter-State Championships, also at Bhubaneswar with a jump of 3.80m.

In July 2026, the Department of Youth Empowerment and Sports (DYES) and the Sports Authority of India (SAI) supported her with three international standard poles and a cash incentive of Rs.5 lakhs.
