= Ren Mengqian =

Chinese pole vaulter (born 1993)

Personal information
- Born: 4 October 1993 (age 32)

Sport
- Country: China
- Sport: Track and field
Medal record
Women's athletics
Representing China
Asian Indoor Championships
Silver medal – second place	2014 Hangzhou	Pole vault
Silver medal – second place	2016 Doha	Pole vault

Ren Mengqian (Chinese: 任梦茜; born 4 October 1993) is a pole vaulter from China. She competed at the 2015 World Championships in Beijing.

Her personal bests in the event are 4.50 metres outdoors (Taiyuan 2015) and 4.40 metres indoors (Beijing 2013).

== Competition record ==
Year	Competition	Venue	Position	Notes
Representing China
2013	Asian Championships	Pune, India	2nd	4.40 m
2014	Asian Indoor Championships	Hangzhou, China	2nd	4.15 m
2015	Asian Championships	Wuhan, China	5th	4.10 m
2015	World Championships	Beijing, China	25th (q)	4.15 m
2016	Asian Indoor Championships	Doha, Qatar	2nd	4.30 m
2016	Olympic Games	Rio de Janeiro, Brazil	–	NM
