= Tomomi Abiko =

Japanese pole vaulter (born 1988)

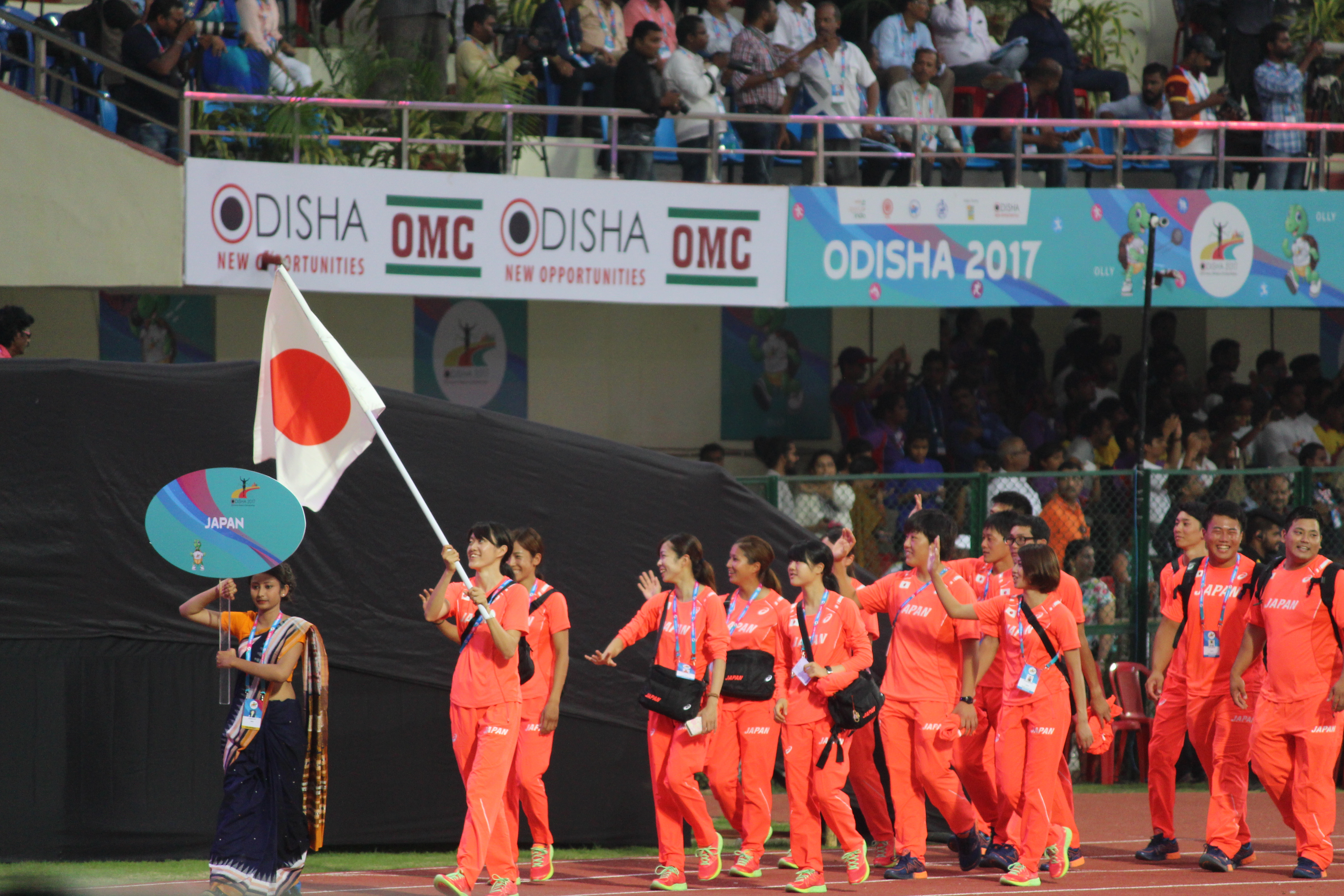
- Abiko (Flag bearer) at the 2017 Asian Championships opening ceremony

Personal information
- Born: 17 March 1988 (age 38) Kusatsu, Shiga, Japan
- Height: 1.73 m (5 ft 8 in)
- Weight: 53 kg (117 lb)

Sport
- Country: Japan
- Sport: Athletics
- Event: Pole vault
- Club: Shiga Lakestars

Achievements and titles
- Personal best: 4.40 m (9 June 2012)
Medal record
Women's athletics
Representing Japan
Asian Indoor Championships
Gold medal – first place	2014 Hangzhou	Pole vault
Bronze medal – third place	2016 Doha	Pole vault

Tomomi Abiko (我孫子 智美, Abiko Tomomi; born 17 March 1988) is a Japanese track and field athlete who competes in the pole vault. She won at the 2012 Japan Championships. She is Japanese record holder in the Women's pole vault. She competed in the Women's pole vault at the 2012 Summer Olympics.

== Competition record ==
Year	Competition	Venue	Position	Notes
Representing Japan
2005	World Youth Championships	Marrakesh, Morocco	10th	3.80 m
2006	World Junior Championships	Beijing, China	7th	4.00 m
2009	East Asian Games	Hong Kong, China	3rd	3.90 m
2010	Asian Games	Guangzhou, China	3rd	4.15 m
2011	Asian Championships	Kobe, Japan	–	NM
2012	Olympic Games	London, United Kingdom	19th (q)	4.25 m
2014	Asian Indoor Championships	Hangzhou, China	1st	4.30 m
2014	Asian Games	Incheon, South Korea	2nd	4.25 m
2015	Asian Championships	Wuhan, China	3rd	4.20 m
2016	Asian Indoor Championships	Doha, Qatar	3rd	4.15 m
2017	Asian Championships	Bhubaneswar, India	–	NM

== See also ==
- List of pole vault national champions (women)
- List of Asian Games medalists in athletics
