= Li Caixia =

Chinese pole vaulter

Medal record

Women's athletics

Representing China

Asian Games
Gold medal – first place	2010 Guangzhou	Pole vault

Asian Championships
Gold medal – first place	2009 Guangzhou	Pole vault

Li Caixia (Chinese: 李彩霞) is a Chinese track and field athlete who competes in the pole vault.

Li was born 23 August 1987 in Xi'an. She began pole vaulting in 2005 and began to make progress in the senior ranks in 2009. She cleared a personal best mark of 4.40 metres at the Shanghai Golden Grand Prix and did the same feat again to win the silver medal at the 11th Chinese National Games behind Wu Sha. She followed this up with an appearance at the 2009 Asian Athletics Championships the following month and she defeated Wu to win the gold medal.

She made her global debut at the 2010 IAAF World Indoor Championships and set an indoor best of 4.20 m, which was not enough to make the final cut. She held off a challenge from Li Ling to take the pole vault title at the Chinese championships with a personal best of 4.45 m. As a result, she was selected to represent the Asia-Pacific team at the 2010 IAAF Continental Cup and achieved a new personal best clearance of 4.50 m to finish in fourth place. She secured the gold medal at the 2010 Asian Games and completed a Chinese 1–2 with Li.
