= Chayanisa Chomchuendee =

Thai pole vaulter

Chayanisa Chomchuendee (formerly known as Sukanya Chomchuendee; (Thai: ชญาณิศา ชมชื่นดี; born 9 September 1988 in Surin) is a Thai pole vaulter.

Her personal bests of 4.30 metres outdoors (2018) and 3.70 metres indoors (2009) are current national records.

== International Competitions ==
Year	Competition	Venue	Position	Notes
Representing Thailand
2009	Asian Indoor Games	Hanoi, Vietnam	4th	3.70 m
2009	Southeast Asian Games	Vientiane, Laos	3rd	3.75 m
2010	Asian Games	Guangzhou, China	6th	3.80 m
2011	Universiade	Shenzhen, China	17th (q)	3.95 m
2011	Southeast Asian Games	Palembang, Indonesia	5th	3.80 m
2013	Asian Championships	Pune, India	3rd	4.15 m
2013	Southeast Asian Games	Naypyidaw, Myanmar	1st	4.21 m GR, NR
2014	Asian Games	Incheon, South Korea	6th	3.90 m
2015	Southeast Asian Games	Singapore	1st	4.10 m
2015	Universiade	Gwangju, South Korea	15th (q)	3.85 m
2017	Asian Championships	Bhubaneswar, India	3rd	4.10 m
2017	Southeast Asian Games	Kuala Lumpur, Malaysia	1st	4.10 m
2018	Asian Games	Jakarta, Indonesia	2nd	4.30 m
2023	Asian Championships	Bangkok, Thailand	3rd	4.10 m
2023	Asian Games	Hangzhou, China	4th	4.20 m
2024	Asian Indoor Championships	Tehran, Iran	2nd	4.41 m
2025	Asian Championships	Gumi, South Korea	–	NM

== National Competition ==
Year	Competition	Venue	Position	Notes
2018	Thailand National Games	Chiang Rai, Thailand	1st	4.10 m
