= 2017 Asian Athletics Championships – Women's pole vault =

The women's pole vault at the 2017 Asian Athletics Championships was held on 9 July.

== Results ==
Rank	Name	Nationality	3.55	3.70	3.85	4.00	4.10	4.20	4.30	4.40	4.50	Result	Notes
1st place, gold medalist(s)	Chen Qiaoling	China	–	–	–	xo	o	–	–	o	xxx	4.40	
2nd place, silver medalist(s)	Li Ling	China	–	–	–	–	–	o	–	x–	xx	4.20	
3rd place, bronze medalist(s)	Chayanisa Chomchuendee	Thailand	o	o	o	o	xo	xxx				4.10	
4	Kanae Tatsuta	Japan	–	o	o	o	xxx					4.00	
	Tomomi Abiko	Japan	–	–	–	xxx						NM	
	K.M. Sangeeta	India										NM	
