= Kanae Tatsuta =

Japanese pole vaulter

Personal information
- Nationality: Japanese
- Born: 21 July 1992 (age 33) Osaka, Japan
- Education: Mukogawa Women's University
- Height: 1.62 m (5 ft 4 in)

Sport
- Country: Japan
- Sport: Track and field
- Event: Pole vault

Achievements and titles
- Personal best: 4.30 m (Sapporo 2019)

Kanae Tatsuta (竜田 夏苗, Tatsuta Kanae; born 21 July 1992 in Osaka) is a Japanese pole vaulter. She represented her country at two-time Asian Championships and one-time Asian Indoor Championships. She is a two-time national champion.

== Personal bests ==
Event	Height	Competition	Venue	Date
Outdoor	4.30 m	Chuhei Nanbu Memorial	Sapporo, Japan	7 July 2019
Indoor	4.10 m	Japanese Junior Indoor Meet	Osaka, Japan	9 February 2014

== International competition ==
Year	Competition	Venue	Position	Event	Height
Representing Japan
2013	Asian Championships	Pune, India	6th	Pole vault	4.00 m
2014	Asian Indoor Championships	Hangzhou, China	4th	Pole vault	3.80 m
2017	Asian Championships	Bhubaneswar, India	4th	Pole vault	4.00 m

== National titles ==
- Japanese Championships
  - Pole vault: 2013, 2015
