= Athletics at the 2011 Summer Universiade – Women's pole vault =

The women's pole vault event at the 2011 Summer Universiade was held on 17–19 August.

== Medalists ==
| Gold | Silver | Bronze |
|---|---|---|
| Aleksandra Kiryashova; Russia | Tina Šutej; Slovenia | Katerina Stefanidi; Greece |

== Results ==
=== Qualification ===
Qualification: 4.15 m (Q) or at least 12 best (q) qualified for the final.

| Rank | Group | Athlete | Nationality | 3.60 | 3.75 | 3.85 | 3.95 | 4.05 | 4.15 | Result | Notes |
|---|---|---|---|---|---|---|---|---|---|---|---|
| 1 | A | Anna Battke | Germany | – | – | – | – | – | o | 4.15 | Q |
| 1 | A | Joanna Piwowarska | Poland | – | – | – | – | – | o | 4.15 | Q |
| 1 | A | Elena Scarpellini | Italy | – | – | – | – | o | o | 4.15 | Q |
| 1 | A | Katerina Stefanidi | Greece | – | – | – | – | o | o | 4.15 | Q |
| 1 | B | Tina Šutej | Slovenia | – | – | – | – | o | o | 4.15 | Q |
| 6 | A | Marion Lotout | France | – | – | – | o | xo | o | 4.15 | Q |
| 7 | B | Sally Peake | Great Britain | – | – | o | – | xxo | o | 4.15 | Q |
| 8 | A | Gabriella Duclos-Lasnier | Canada | – | – | – | – | o | xo | 4.15 | Q |
| 9 | A | Anastasia Savchenko | Russia | – | – | – | o | xo | xo | 4.15 | Q |
| 10 | B | Mélanie Blouin | Canada | – | – | – | – | o | xxo | 4.15 | Q |
| 10 | B | Romana Maláčová | Czech Republic | – | – | – | o | o | xxo | 4.15 | Q |
| 12 | B | Aleksandra Kiryashova | Russia | – | – | – | – | xo | xxo | 4.15 | Q |
| 13 | B | Télie Mathiot | France | – | – | o | – | xxo | xxo | 4.15 | Q |
| 14 | B | Dimitra Emmanouil | Greece | – | – | xxo | o | o | xxx | 4.05 | |
| 15 | A | Aurélie de Ryck | Belgium | – | o | – | o | xxx | | 3.95 | |
| 15 | A | Iben Høgh-Pedersen | Denmark | – | – | o | o | xxx | | 3.95 | |
| 17 | B | Sukanya Chomchuendee | Thailand | – | o | xo | xo | xxx | | 3.95 | |
| 18 | A | Jerneja Writzl | Slovenia | o | xo | o | xxx | | | 3.85 | |
| 19 | B | Tatyana Turkova | Kazakhstan | o | xo | xxo | xxx | | | 3.85 | |
| | B | V. Freiin von Eynatten | Germany | – | – | – | xxx | | | NM | |
| | B | Li Ling | China | – | – | – | – | – | xxx | NM | |

=== Final ===
| Rank | Athlete | Nationality | 3.95 | 4.10 | 4.25 | 4.35 | 4.45 | 4.55 | 4.65 | 4.70 | Result | Notes |
|---|---|---|---|---|---|---|---|---|---|---|---|---|
| 1st place, gold medalist(s) | Aleksandra Kiryashova | Russia | – | – | o | o | o | xo | xo | xxx | 4.65 | =PB |
| 2nd place, silver medalist(s) | Tina Šutej | Slovenia | – | o | o | o | o | o | xxx | | 4.55 | |
| 3rd place, bronze medalist(s) | Katerina Stefanidi | Greece | – | xo | xo | o | xxo | xxx | | | 4.45 | =PB |
| 4 | Sally Peake | Great Britain | o | o | o | xo | xxx | | | | 4.35 | PB |
| 5 | Joanna Piwowarska | Poland | – | o | xo | xxo | xxx | | | | 4.35 | SB |
| 6 | Anna Battke | Germany | – | – | o | xxx | | | | | 4.25 | |
| 7 | Elena Scarpellini | Italy | – | xo | o | xxx | | | | | 4.25 | |
| 8 | Mélanie Blouin | Canada | xxo | o | o | xxx | | | | | 4.25 | =PB |
| 8 | Marion Lotout | France | o | xxo | o | xxx | | | | | 4.25 | |
| 10 | Romana Maláčová | Czech Republic | o | o | xxo | xxx | | | | | 4.25 | SB |
| 11 | Gabriella Duclos-Lasnier | Canada | – | o | xxx | | | | | | 4.10 | |
| 11 | Télie Mathiot | France | – | o | xxx | | | | | | 4.10 | |
| 13 | Anastasia Savchenko | Russia | o | xo | xxx | | | | | | 4.10 | |
