= Roslinda Samsu =

Malaysian pole vaulter

Personal information
- Nationality: Malaysia
- Born: 9 June 1982 (age 44) Padang Terap, Malaysia
- Height: 1.60 m (5 ft 3 in)
- Weight: 52 kg (115 lb)

Sport
- Sport: Athletics
- Event: Pole vault
- Club: MAAU (MAS)
- Coached by: Mohd Mansahar Abdul Jalil
Medal record
Women's athletics
Representing Malaysia
Asian Games
Silver medal – second place	2006 Doha	Pole vault
Asian Championships
Gold medal – first place	2007 Amman	Pole vault
Bronze medal – third place	2005 Incheon	Pole vault
Asian Indoor Championships
Gold medal – first place	2010 Tehran	Pole vault
Silver medal – second place	2004 Tehran	Pole vault
Silver medal – second place	2008 Doha	Pole vault
Southeast Asian Games
Gold medal – first place	2005 Manila	Pole vault
Gold medal – first place	2007 Bangkok	Pole vault
Gold medal – first place	2009 Vientiane	Pole vault
Gold medal – first place	2011 Palembang	Pole vault
Silver medal – second place	2001 Kuala Lumpur	Pole vault
Bronze medal – third place	2003 Hanoi	Pole vault

Roslinda Samsu (born 9 June 1982 in Padang Terap) is a Malaysian pole vaulter. She is a four-time defending champion at the Southeast Asian Games, and a silver medalist at the 2006 Asian Games in Doha, Qatar. She won the bronze medal at the 2005 Asian Athletics Championships in Incheon, South Korea, but nearly missed out of the podium at the 2006 Commonwealth Games in Melbourne, Australia. She was also able to clear her personal best of 4.20 metres to capture the gold medal at the 2007 Asian Athletics Championships in Amman, Jordan.

Roslinda represented Malaysia the 2008 Summer Olympics in Beijing, after reaching a qualifying mark of 4.30 metres in both the indoor and outdoor meets. She competed in the women's pole vault, an event which was prominently dominated by Russia's Yelena Isinbayeva. Roslinda cleared the bar in the preliminary rounds, with her seasonal best distance of 4.30 metres, tying her position with Australia's Alana Boyd, in eighth place for the group, and in sixteenth overall.

== Competition record ==
Year	Competition	Venue	Position	Notes
Representing Malaysia
1999	World Youth Championships	Bydgoszcz, British Columbia	15th (q)	3.20 m
1999	Asian Junior Championships	Singapore	5th	3.40 m
2000	Asian Championships	Jakarta, Indonesia	4th	3.70 m
2001	Asian Junior Championships	Bandar Seri Begawan, Brunei	2nd	3.70 m
2001	Southeast Asian Games	Kuala Lumpur, Malaysia	2nd	3.80 m
2003	Universiade	Daegu, South Korea	–	NM
2003	Southeast Asian Games	Hanoi, Vietnam	3rd	3.60 m
2004	Asian Indoor Championships	Tehran, Iran	2nd	4.00 m
2005	Asian Championships	Incheon, South Korea	3rd	4.10 m
2005	Southeast Asian Games	Manila, Philippines	1st	4.10 m
2006	Commonwealth Games	Melbourne, Australia	4th	4.25 m
2006	Asian Games	Doha, Qatar	2nd	4.30 m
2007	Asian Championships	Amman, Jordan	1st	4.20 m
2007	Universiade	Bangkok, Thailand	5th	4.20 m
2007	World Championships	Osaka, Japan	23rd (q)	4.35 m
2007	Southeast Asian Games	Nakhon Ratchasima, Thailand	1st	4.00 m
2008	Asian Indoor Championships	Doha, Qatar	2nd	4.10 m
2008	Olympic Games	Beijing, China	16th (q)	4.30 m
2009	World Championships	Berlin, Germany	24th (q)	4.25 m
2009	Asian Championships	Guangzhou, China	5th	3.60 m
2009	Southeast Asian Games	Vientiane, Laos	1st	4.15 m
2010	Asian Indoor Championships	Tehran, Iran	1st	4.00 m
2010	Commonwealth Games	Delhi, India	10th	3.95 m
2010	Asian Games	Guangzhou, China	5th	4.00 m
2011	Southeast Asian Games	Palembang, Indonesia	1st	4.20 m
