= Xu Huiqin =

Chinese pole vaulter (born 1993)

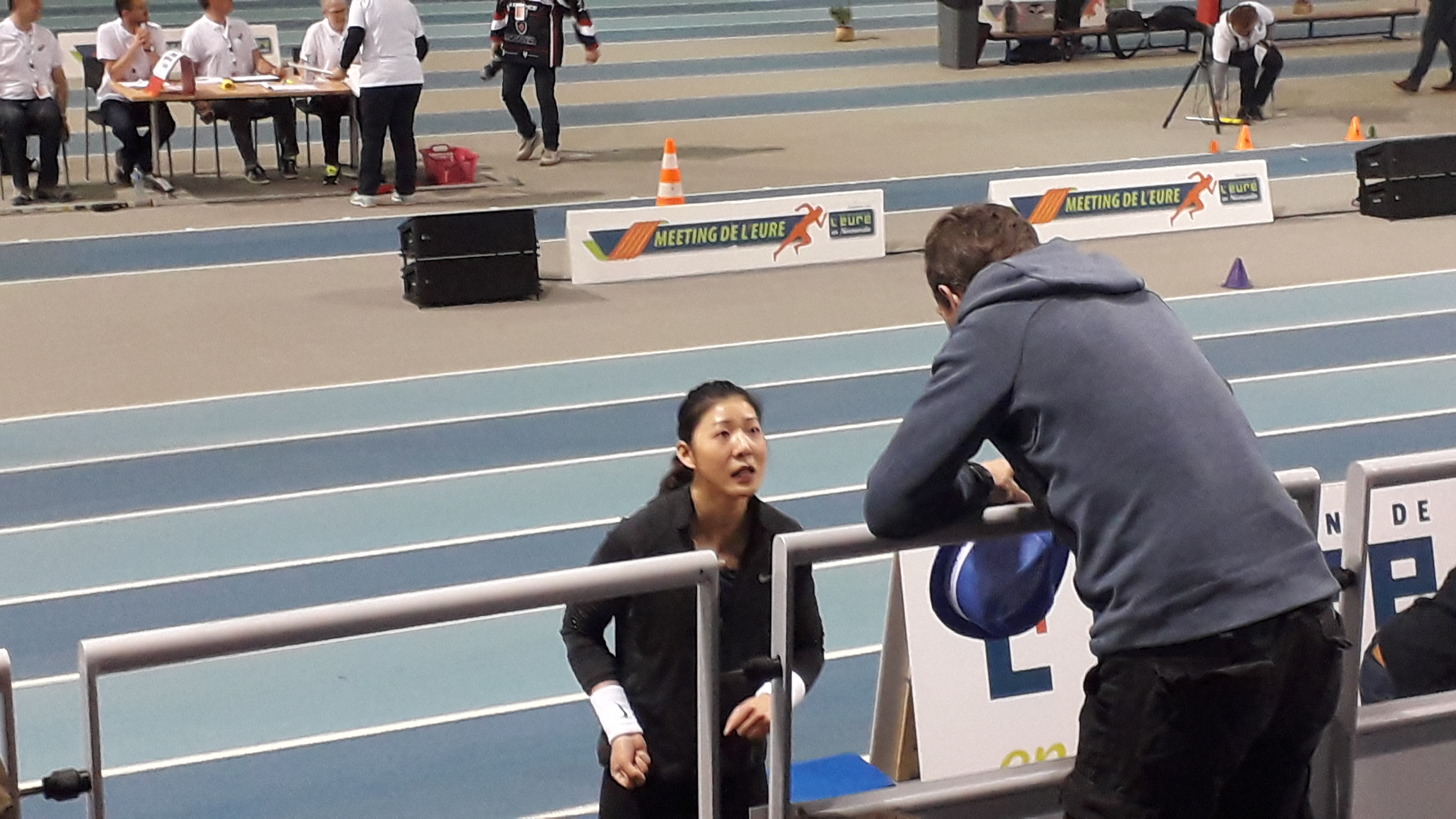
- Xu in 2020

Personal information
- Born: 4 September 1993 (age 32) Haiyan, Zhejiang, China

Sport
- Sport: Athletics
- Event: Pole vault
Medal record
Women's athletics
Representing China
Asian Indoor Championships
Silver medal – second place	2014 Hangzhou	Pole vault

Xu Huiqin (Chinese: 徐惠琴; born 4 September 1993) is a Chinese athlete specialising in the pole vault. She has won several medals on continental level.

Her personal bests in the event are 4.70 metres outdoors (Jockgrim 2019) and 4.65 metres indoors (Lievin, 2022).

== International competitions ==
Year	Competition	Venue	Position	Notes
Representing China
2009	Asian Youth Games	Singapore	1st	3.75 m
2010	Asian Junior Championships	Hanoi, Vietnam	1st	3.90 m
2010	Youth Olympic Games	Singapore	4th	4.10 m
2012	Asian Indoor Championships	Hangzhou, China	4th	4.15 m
2012	Asian Junior Championships	Colombo, Sri Lanka	1st	4.25 m
2012	World Junior Championships	Barcelona, Spain	8th	4.05 m
2014	Asian Indoor Championships	Hangzhou, China	2nd	4.15 m
2014	Asian Games	Incheon, South Korea	4th	4.05 m
2015	Asian Championships	Wuhan, China	2nd	4.30 m
2019	Asian Championships	Doha, Qatar	2nd	4.36 m
2019	World Championships	Doha, Qatar	19th (q)	4.50 m
2021	Olympic Games	Tokyo, Japan	8th	4.50 m
2022	World Indoor Championships	Belgrade, Serbia	7th	4.45 m
2022	World Championships	Eugene, United States	13th	4.30 m
2023	World Championships	Budapest， Hungary	–	NM
2025	Asian Championships	Gumi, South Korea	2nd	4.23 m
