= Chloé Henry =

Belgian gymnast and pole vaulter

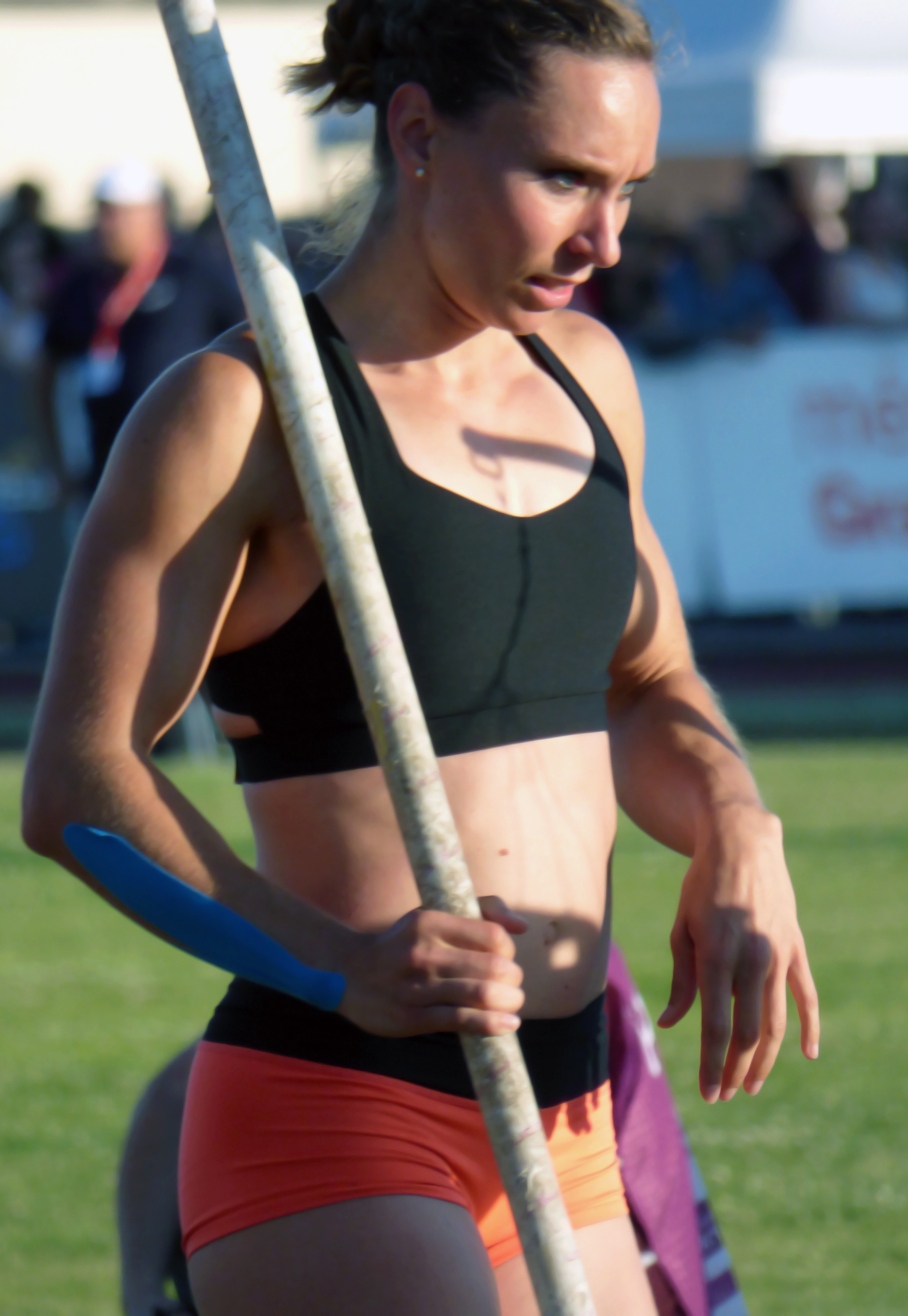

Personal information
- Full name: Chloé Henry
- Nationality: Belgium
- Born: 5 March 1987 (age 39) Corpus Christi, Texas, U.S.
- Education: Blaise Pascal University
- Height: 1.70 m (5 ft 7 in)
- Weight: 59 kg (130 lb)

Sport
- Country: Belgium
- Sport: track and field, artistic gymnastics
- Event: pole vault
- Club: RESC
- Coached by: Herbert Czingon
Medal record
Women's athletics
Representing Belgium
Summer Universiade
Bronze medal – third place	2015 Gwangju	Pole vault

Chloé Henry (born 5 March 1987) is a Belgian gymnast and pole vaulter. She is multiple times Belgian Champion and National Record holder in pole vault. She is also known for her participation in Ninja Warrior France season 2. She made it to the semi-final where she became the last woman standing, just missing out on the finals.

== Career ==
=== Artistic gymnastics ===
Chloé Henry was born 5 March 1987 in Corpus Christi, Texas, and lived in the United States until she was eight years old, where she started artistic gymnastics. She moved to Belgium where she started her international artistic gymnastics career. She participated in a number of European Championships and one World Championship. She was also selected to compete at the 2007 World Championship, but dislocated her elbow prior to the championship, which took her out of the running for the 2008 Olympic Games in Beijing, China. In 2006, she was the Belgian Champion. In 2008 she refocused her objectives to pole vault.

=== Five titles in three years ===
After five months in pole vault she received her first medal at the National Championship, when she jumped over 3m35 to take home the bronze. In 2012, she became for the first time Belgian indoor Champion, a title maintained in 2013, 2014, and 2015. In 2012, 2014, and 2015 she also became the Outdoor Belgian Champion.

=== National records ===
Henry holds the indoor and outdoor National Record. She bettered a 10-year-old national record with a jump over 4m22 in December 2011 in Sittard, Netherlands, Belgian indoor record. In 2012, 2013, and 2014 she increased the record to 4m29 at the KBC Nacht, 4m33, 4m41, and 4m42 respectively national record. During an official competition in Brussels, Belgium she also jumped a Belgian record at 4m26, which was later not recognised by the Flemish Federation.

=== Making History ===
Henry was the first Belgian female pole vaulter to ever qualify for a European Championships when she jumped the qualifying standard, 4m40, on 21/04/2016 in Chula Vista, CA, USA for the 2016 European Championships in Amsterdam.

=== Club ===
- 2016- RESC, Royal Excelsior Sports Club Brussels
- 2014-2016 USBW, Union Sportive Braine-Waterloo
- 2008-2014 KVAC, Koninklijke Vilvoorde Atletiek Club

== Belgium Champion ==
Outdoor

Discipline	Year
Pole vault	2012, 2014, 2015

Indoor

Discipline	Year
Pole vault	2012, 2013, 2014, 2015

== Personal records ==
Season	Result	Date	Location
Pole vault outdoor	4,42 m (nat. rec.)	22 August 2015	Waremme, Bel
Pole vault indoor	4,33 m	28 February 2015	Zweibrücken, Ger

== National records ==
Result	Date	Location
4,42 m (nat. rec.)	22 August 2015	Waremme, Bel
4,33 m (nat. indoor rec.)	28 February 2015	Zweibücken, Ger
4,31m (nat. indoor rec.)	10 January 2015	Aubière, Fra
4,41 m (nat. rec.)	15 August 2014	Jemeppe, Bel
4,33 m (nat. rec.)	29 June 2013	Albi, Fra
4,29 m (nat. rec.)	7 July 2012	Heusden-Zolder, Bel
4,26 m (unofficial nat. rec.)	27 June 2012	Brussels, Bel
4,22 m (nat. rec.)	29 December 2011	Sittard, Ned

== Awards ==
=== Artistic gymnastics ===
- 2007: 38th European Championship in Amsterdam, NED
- 2007: (silver) All-Around Belgian Championship - 55,325 p (disputed)
- 2007: (gold) Belgian Championship event final, Bars
- 2007: (gold) Belgian Championship event final, Vault
- 2007: (silver) Belgian Championship event final, Floor
- 2006: 77th World Championship in Aarhus
- 2006: 21st All-Around European Championship in Volos
- 2006: 77th World Championship in Aarhus
- 2006: 8th World Cup Final, bars, Glasgow, SCO
- 2006: 8th World Cup Final, bars, Gent, BEL
- 2006: (gold) All-Around Belgian Championship
- 2006: (silver) Belgian Championship event final, Bars
- 2005: (silver) All-Around Belgian Championship
- 2005: 32nd All-Around European Championship in Debrecen, HUN
- 2004: 35th All-Around European Championship in Amsterdam, NED

=== Pole Vault ===
- 2015: (gold) Belgian Championship – 4,10 m
- 2015: (bronze) Summer Universiade in Gwangju, Kor – 4,40 m
- 2015: (gold) Belgian Championship – 4,20 m
- 2014: (gold) Belgian Championship – 4,20 m
- 2014: (gold) Belgian Championship indoor – 4,25 m
- 2013: 6e Summer Universiade in Kazan, Rus – 4,30 m
- 2013: (silver) Belgian Championship – 4,20 m
- 2013: (gold) Belgian Championship indoor – 4,05 m
- 2012: (gold) Belgian Championship – 4,20 m
- 2012: (gold) Belgian Championship indoor – 4,25 m
- 2011: (silver) Belgian Championship – 3,85 m
- 2011: (silver) Belgian Championship indoor – 3,85 m
- 2010: (silver) Belgian Championship – 3,70 m
- 2009: (silver) Belgian Championship – 3,85 m
- 2008: (bronze) Belgian Championship – 3,35 m
