= University of Auckland Faculty of Science =

Faculty of Science
- Te Whare Pūtaiao (Māori)
- Type: Public
- Parent institution: University of Auckland
- Dean: Sarah Young
- Students: > 7,000
- Location: Auckland, New Zealand
- Website: science.auckland.ac.nz

The University of Auckland Faculty of Science (Māori: Te Whare Pūtaiao) is one of six faculties that make up the University of Auckland.

== Location ==
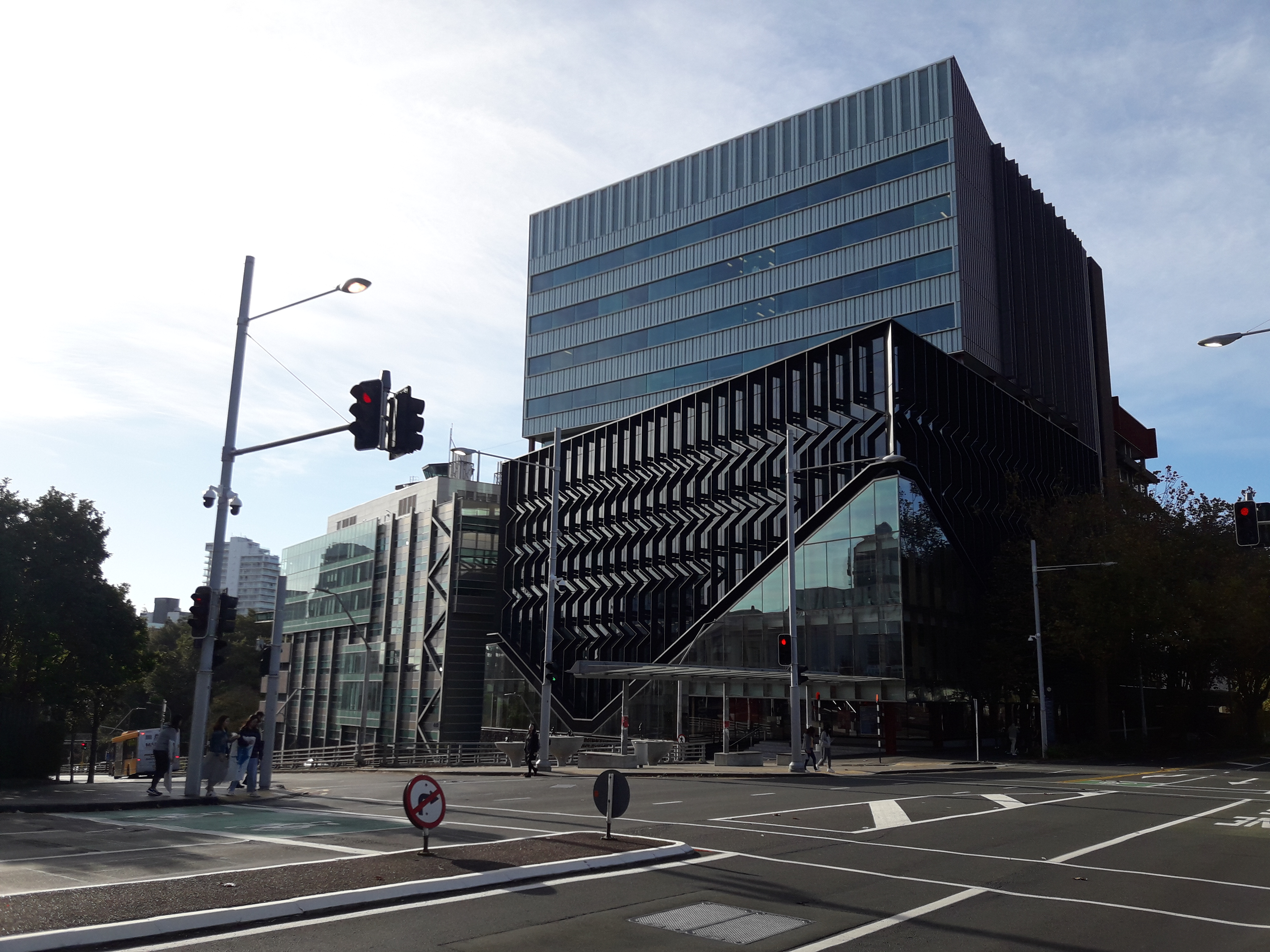
Buildings 303/303S (left) and 302 (right) of the University of Auckland. Building 302 currently houses the Faculty of Science administration office, School of Chemical Sciences, School of Environment, Institute of Marine Science, School of Psychology and Science Assistance Room

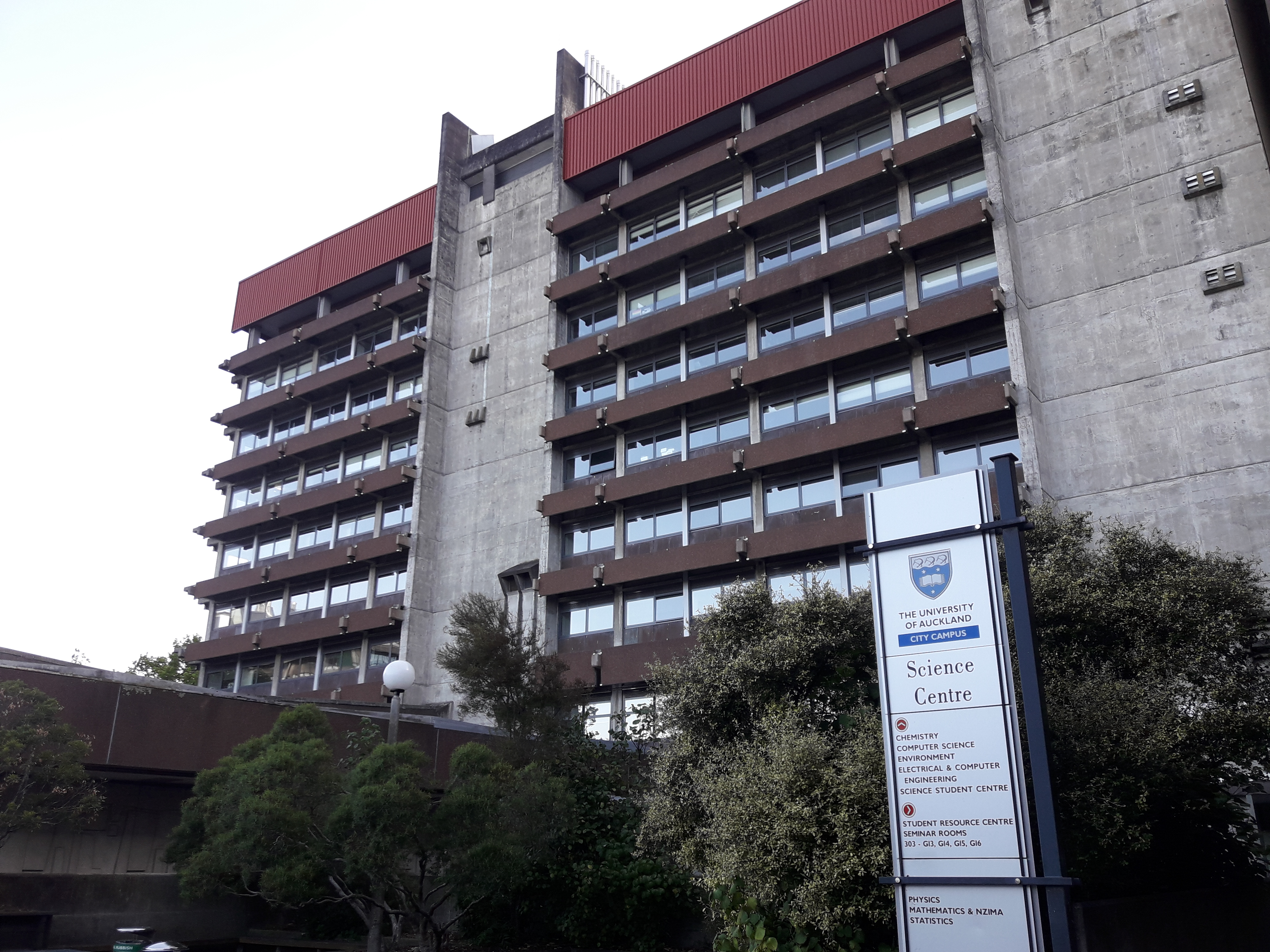
Building 301 of the Science Centre of the University of Auckland, which houses the School of Chemical Sciences, School of Environment, Department of Electrical & Computer Engineering, as well as student facilities including the Science Student Centre, Science Resource Centre and Muslim Prayer Room

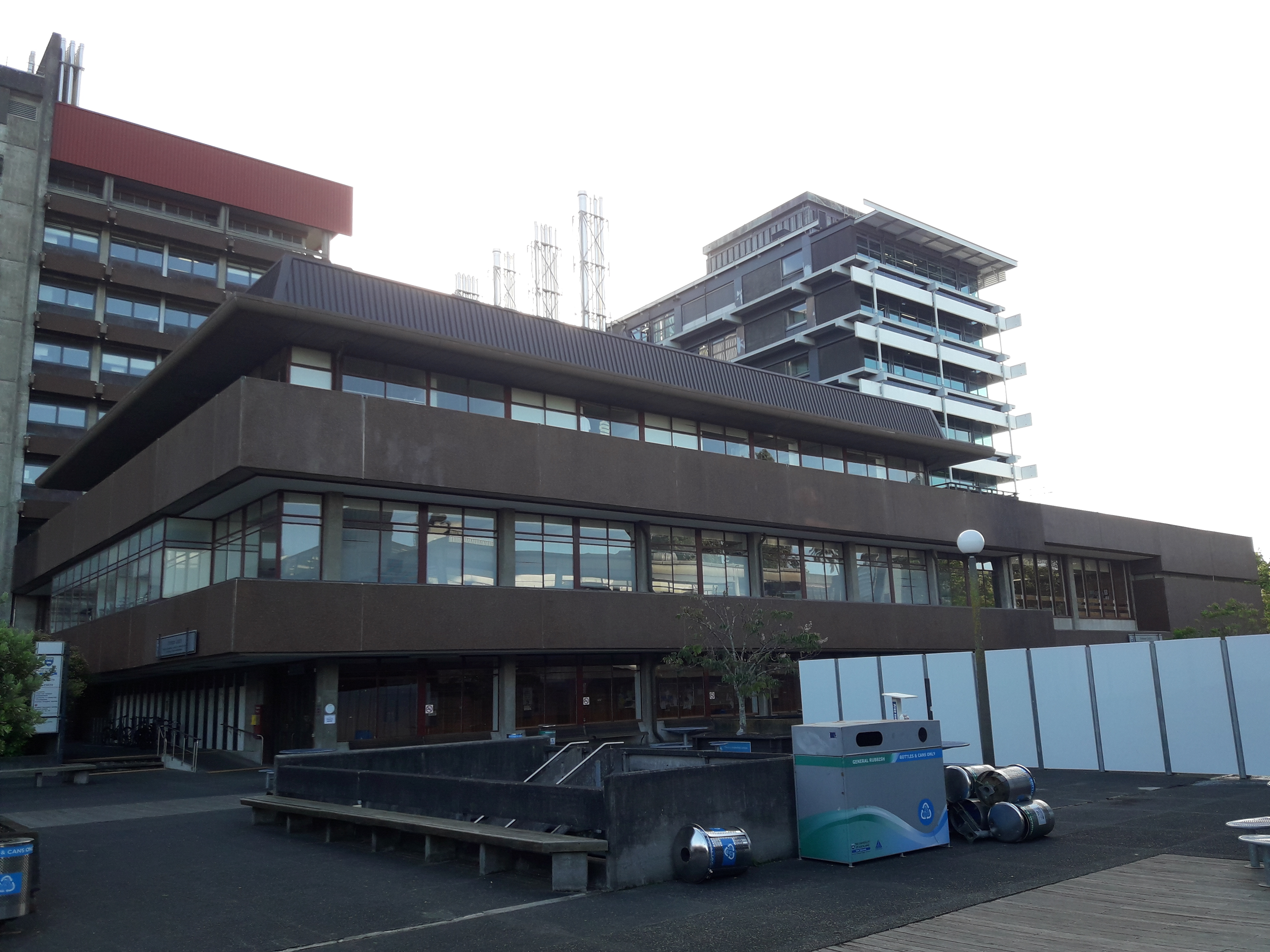
Building 303 of the Science Centre of the University of Auckland, which currently houses the School of Computer Science, Department of Mathematics, Department of Physics, Department of Statistics and Te Pūnaha Matatini

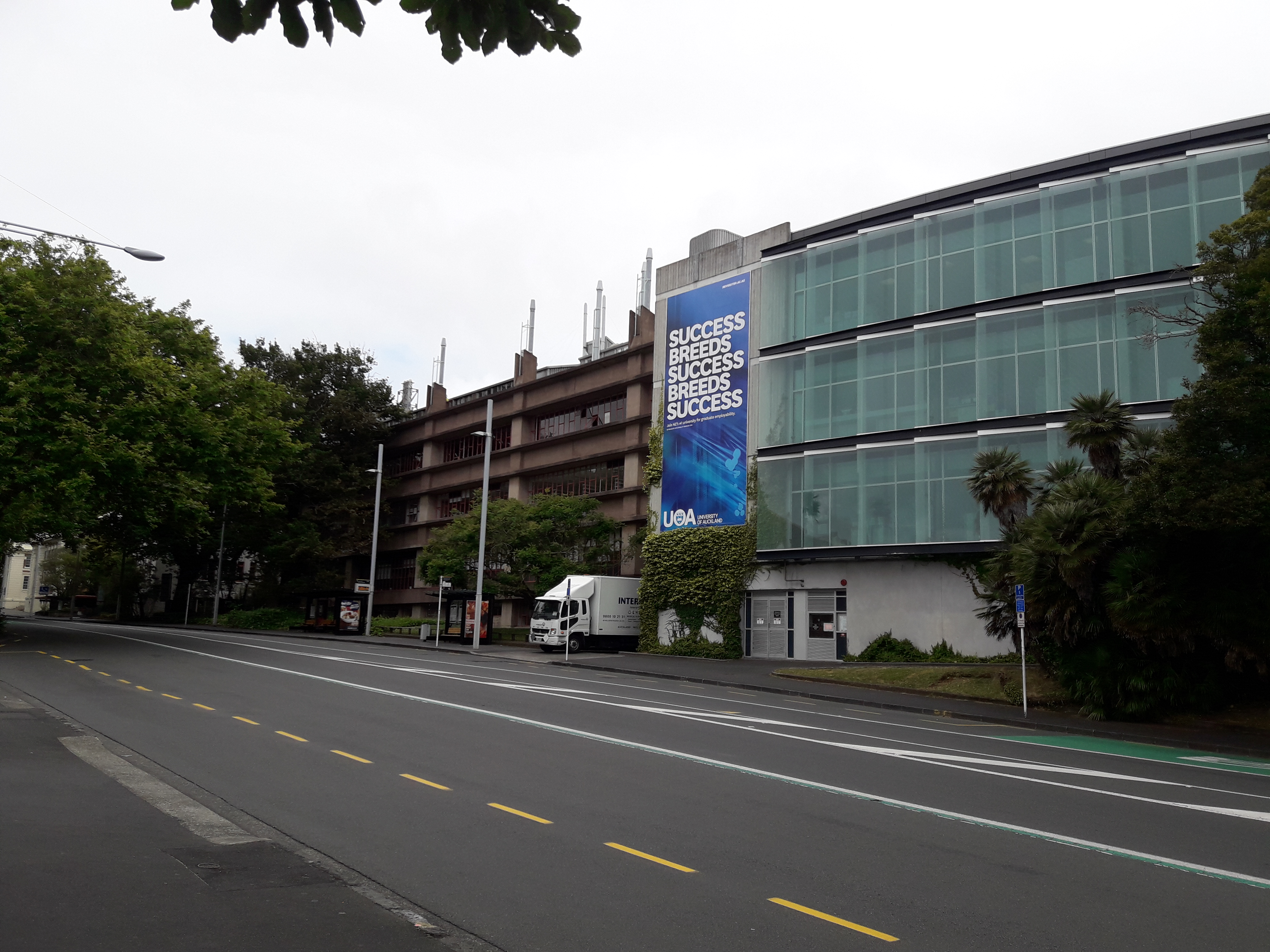
Thomas Building Complex - Buildings 110 (left) & 110N (right) - of the University of Auckland, which houses the School of Biological Sciences (SBS) and Maurice Wilkins Centre for Molecular Biodiscovery. Note the poster on the building features an unusual University of Auckland logo.

The Faculty of Science houses several Schools, Departments and Institutes. These are based in various locations, including the City Campus, Newmarket Campus, Leigh Campus, Tāmaki Innovation Campus and the Grafton Campus.

In November 2013, the Faculty of Science embarked on a NZ$200m redevelopment/expansion project on its main buildings in the City Campus. Following multiple delays, the state-of-the-art Science Centre was opened in July 2017. The Faculty of Science administration office is based on level 6 of the new Science Centre. In 2018, design work has begun for the potential development of a new "Gateway building" on Symonds Street to replace the Thomas Building Complex for the School of Biological Sciences.

== Divisions ==
The Faculty of Science comprises the following Schools and Departments:

- School of Biological Sciences
- School of Chemical Sciences
- School of Computer Science
- School of Environment
- Institute of Marine Science
- Department of Mathematics
- Department of Physics
- School of Psychology
- Department of Exercise Sciences
- Department of Statistics

The Faculty of Science also hosts several research institutes and centres:

- Bioinformatics Institute
- Centre for Biodiversity and Biosecurity
- Centre for Computational Evolution
- Centre for eResearch
- Centre for Green Chemical Science
- George Mason Centre for the Natural Environment
- Institute for Innovation in Biotechnology
- The Cyber Security Foundry

== Science Programs ==
Undergraduate Programs

- Bachelor of Science (BSc)
- Graduate Diploma in Science (GradDipSci)

In 2020, the Faculty of Science will offer a new four-year programme called Bachelor of Advanced Science (Honours) (BAdvSci(Hons)), a programme that is designed for high achieving students who want to pursue postgraduate research.

Conjoint Programs

- Bachelor of Arts/Bachelor of Science - (BA/BSc)
- Bachelor of Commerce/Bachelor of Science - (BCom/BSc)
- Bachelor of Engineering(Hons)/Bachelor of Science - (BE(Hons)/BSc)
- Bachelor of Science/Bachelor of Nursing - (BSc/BNurs)
- Bachelor of Music/Bachelor of Science - (BMus/BSc)
- Bachelor of Property/Bachelor of Science - (BProp/BSc)
- Bachelor of Science/Bachelor of Laws - (BSc/LLB)
- Bachelor of Science/Bachelor of Laws(Hons) - (BSc/LLB(Hons))

Postgraduate Programs

- Honours
  - Bachelor of Science (Honours)
- Postgraduate Certificate/Diploma
  - Postgraduate Certificate in Information Technology
  - Postgraduate Diploma in Science (PGDipSci)
  - Postgraduate Diploma in Applied Psychology (PGDipAppPsych)
  - Postgraduate Diploma in Bioscience Enterprise (PGDipBioEnt)
  - Postgraduate Diploma in Clinical Psychology (PGDipClinPsy)
  - Postgraduate Diploma in Forensic Science (PGDipForensic)
  - Postgraduate Diploma in Operations Research (PGDipOR)
- Masters
  - Master of Information Technology
  - Master of Speech Language Therapy Practice (MSLTPrac)
  - Master of Professional Studies in Data Science (MProfStuds)
  - Master of Professional Studies in Digital Security (MProfStuds)
  - Master of Professional Studies in Food Safety (MProfStuds)
  - Master of Professional Studies in Mathematics Education (MProfStuds)
  - Master of Science (MSc)
  - Master of Bioscience Enterprise (MBioEnt)
  - Master of Operations Research(MOR)

Doctoral Programs

- Doctor of Philosophy (PhD)
- Doctor of Clinical Psychology (DClinPsy)

Other Programs

- Graduate Certificate in Innovation and Entrepreneurship (GradCertInnovEnt)
- Graduate Diploma in Innovation and Entrepreneurship (GradDipInnovEnt)
- Postgraduate Certificate in Commercialisation and Entrepreneurship (PGCertCE)
- Master of Energy (MEnergy)
- Masters of Commercialisation and Entrepreneurship (MCE)
- Certificate of Proficiency (COP)

== Official magazine ==
inSCight is the official magazine of the Faculty of Science at the University of Auckland. It was first published in 2007. The magazine is published annually. The target audience of the inSCight magazine is the alumni and friends of the faculty.
