= Wu Sha =

Chinese pole vaulter

Medal record

Women's athletics

Representing China

Asian Championships
Gold medal – first place	2003 Manila	Pole vault

Wu Sha (Chinese: 吴莎; pinyin: Wú Shā; born 21 October 1985) is a Chinese pole vaulter. Her personal best jump is 4.40 metres, achieved in 2009 in Jinan. She is married to Liu Xiang.

== Career ==
On 21 September 2003, in the women's pole vault final of the 15th Asian Track and Field Championships, Wu Sha won the championship with a score of 4.20 meters.

On 19 February 2005, in the women's pole vault final of the Shanghai Station of the 2005 National Indoor Track and Field Championships, Wu Sha won the championship with a score of 4.30 meters. On 2 March, Wu Sha won the championship in the women's pole vault final of the Tianjin Station of the 2005 National Indoor Track and Field Championships.

In June 2007, Wu Sha won the runner-up in the women's pole vault final of the second leg of the 2007 National Track and Field Grand Prix Series. On 23 July, in the women's (Group B) pole vault final of the Eighth University Games of the People's Republic of China, Wu Sha won third place with a score of 4.11 meters.

On 13 April 2008, Wu Sha won the runner-up in the women's pole vault final of the 2008 National Track and Field Grand Prix.

On 13 June 2009, in the second leg of the women's pole vault final of the 2009 National Track and Field Grand Prix Series, Wu Sha won the runner-up with a time of 4.30 meters. On 5 July, in the women's pole vault final of the Jinan Station of the 2009 National Athletics Grand Prix, Wu Sha won the runner-up with a score of 4.15 meters. On 24 October, in the track and field women's pole vault final of the 11th Games of the People's Republic of China, Wu Sha won the championship with a score of 4.40 meters. On 12 November, in the women's pole vault final of the 18th Asian Track and Field Championships, Wu Sha won the runner-up with a score of 4.15 meters.

On 10 March 2010, in the women's pole vault final of the 2010 National Indoor Championships in Nanjing, Wu Sha won the championship with a time of 4.00 meters. In June, in the women's pole vault final at the Zhaoqing Station of the 2010 National Track and Field Grand Prix Series, Wu Sha won the runner-up with a time of 4.00 meters. On 8 August, in the women's pole vault final of the 2010 National Track and Field Championships, Wu Sha won third place with a score of 4.35 meters.

On 25 May 2011, in the women's pole vault final of the Kunshan Station of the 2011 National Track and Field Grand Prix, Wu Sha won the championship with a score of 4.30 meters. On 12 June, in the women's pole vault final of the 2011 National Track and Field Grand Prix Shenzhen Station, Wu Sha won the championship with a score of 4.30 meters. On 9 July, in the women's pole vault final of the 19th Asian Track and Field Championships, Wu Sha won the championship with a score of 4.35 meters.

On 18 February 2012, in the second women's pole vault final of the 2012 National Indoor Championships, Wu Sha won the runner-up with a score of 4.30 meters. In May, in the women's pole vault final of the Zibo Station of the 2012 National Track and Field Grand Prix, Wu Sha won the runner-up with a score of 4.15 meters.

On 8 September 2013, in the women's pole vault final of the 12th Games of the People's Republic of China, Wu Sha won third place with a score of 4.40 meters.

== Achievements ==
Year	Competition	Venue	Position	Notes
Representing China
2002	Asian Junior Championships	Bangkok, Thailand	1st	3.90 m
2003	Asian Championships	Manila, Philippines	1st	4.20 m
2007	Asian Indoor Games	Macau, China	–	NM
2009	Asian Championships	Guangzhou, China	2nd	4.15 m
2011	Asian Championships	Kobe, Japan	1st	4.35 m

After the end of her career, she started dating Liu Xiang.
