= 2007 Asian Athletics Championships – Women's pole vault =

The women's pole vault event at the 2007 Asian Athletics Championships was held in Amman, Jordan on July 29.

== Results ==
| Rank | Name | Nationality | Result | Notes |
|---|---|---|---|---|
| 1st place, gold medalist(s) | Roslinda Samsu | Malaysia | 4.20 | |
| 2nd place, silver medalist(s) | Rachel Yang Bingjie | Singapore | 3.50 | |
| | Li Ling | China | NM | |
