= Misaki Morota =

Japanese athlete

Personal information
- Born: 6 October 1998 (age 28)

Sport
- Sport: Athletics
- Event: Pole vault
Medal record
Women's athletics
Representing Japan
Asian Games
Gold medal – first place	2026 Aichi–Nagoya	Pole vault
Silver medal – second place	2022 Hangzhou	Pole vault
Asian Championships
Bronze medal – third place	2025 Gumi	Pole vault
Asian Indoor Athletics Championships
Silver medal – second place	2026 Tianjin	Pole vault

Misaki Morota (born 6 October 1998) is a Japanese pole vaulter. She is the national record holder and won the gold medal at the 2026 Asian Games. She was also a silver medalist at the previous edition of the Asian Games and the 2026 Asian Indoor Athletics Championships and a bronze medalist at the 2025 Asian Athletics Championships.

== Biography ==
Morota was from an athletic family, with her father a competitor. She began training in pole vault while in her fourth year of elementary school. She trains at the Ajinomoto National Training Centre in Tokyo.

Morota won the silver medal in the pole vault at the delayed 2022 Asian Games held in Hangzhou, China, in 2023, clearing 4.48 metres. That year, she placed fourth at the 2023 Asian Athletics Championships in Bangkok, with a new personal best of 4.48 metres.

In May 2025, she won the bronze medal at the 2025 Asian Athletics Championships in Gumi, South Korea. competed at the 2025 World Athletics Championships in Tokyo, Japan, in September 2025, without advancing to the final.

In February 2026, she won the silver medal at the 2026 Asian Indoor Athletics Championships in Tianjin, clearing 4.35 to finish behind Niu Chunge of China on countback. In September 2026, she set a new Japanese national record with a clearance of 4.51 metres. Later that month, she became the first ever Japanese winner of the women’s pole vault at the Asian Games, winning in Nagoya with a personal best and national record clearance of 4.55 metres to claim the victory ahead of Asian champion Niu Chunge, and ending the run of seven consecutive victories by Chinese athletes since the event was introduced at the 1998 Games.
