= Baranica Elangovan =

Indian pole vaulter (born 1997)

Personal information
- Born: 3 February 1997 (age 29) Kuthalam, Tamil Nadu, India

Sport
- Sport: Athletics
- Event: Pole vault

Achievements and titles
- Personal best: 4.23 m (2026)
Medal record
Women's athletics
Representing India
Asian Games
Bronze medal – third place	2026 Aichi–Nagoya	Pole vault

Baranica Elangovan (born 3 February 1997) is an Indian pole vaulter. She won a bronze medal at the 2026 Asian Games.

== Early life and education ==
Baranica Elangovan was born on 3 February 1997. She hails from an agricultural family in Kuthalam, Mayiladuthurai district, Tamil Nadu. She did her initial schooling in Palayagudalur and took up athletics at class six. Initially she competed in sprint and other field events like long jump and triple jump. She moved to Chennai after she secured admission at Ethiraj College for Women. She did her masters at M.O.P. Vaishnav College for Women, Chennai.

== Career ==
In 2018, Baranica set a new meet record at the All India University competition, clearing 3.80 m (12.5 ft). She was selected by Pudhumai Penn Foundation to be trained by coach Milber Russel. At an athletics event in Bhubaneswar in May 2022, her performance was noticed by Martin Owens, the head coach of the Odisha Reliance Foundation Athletics High Performance Centre, who invited her to train under him. She moved to train at Bhubaneswar in December 2022. While she cleared 4.10 m (13.5 ft) at the Indian Grand Prix event in Bengaluru in early 2023, she later failed to clear higher than 3.80 m (12.5 ft) at the inter-state meet in Bhubaneswar and hence did not make it to the Indian squad for the 2022 Asian Games.

In March 2026, Baranica became the first indoor National champion in pole vault, setting an Indian national record of 4.22 m (13.8 ft) at the National Indoor Athletics Championships at Bhubaneswar. She broke the 4.21 m (13.8 ft) record of compatriot Rosy Meena Paulraj set in 2022. In May 2026, she broke her own record, jumping 4.23 m (13.9 ft), at the Indian Indoor Open at Bhubaneswar. She held the record for two months before it was broken by Sindhushree in July. In May 2026, she won gold medals at the Indian Open Athletics Series in Chennai and 29th National Senior Athletics Competition at Ranchi, both with a jump of 4.10 m (13.5 ft).

Baranica was part of the Indian squad for the 2026 Asian Games. In the women's pole vault event held on 25 September 2026, she won a bronze medal with a jump of 4.15 m (13.6 ft). This was India's first ever medal in pole vault at the Asian Games.
