= Niu Chunge =

Chinese pole vaulter (born 2000)

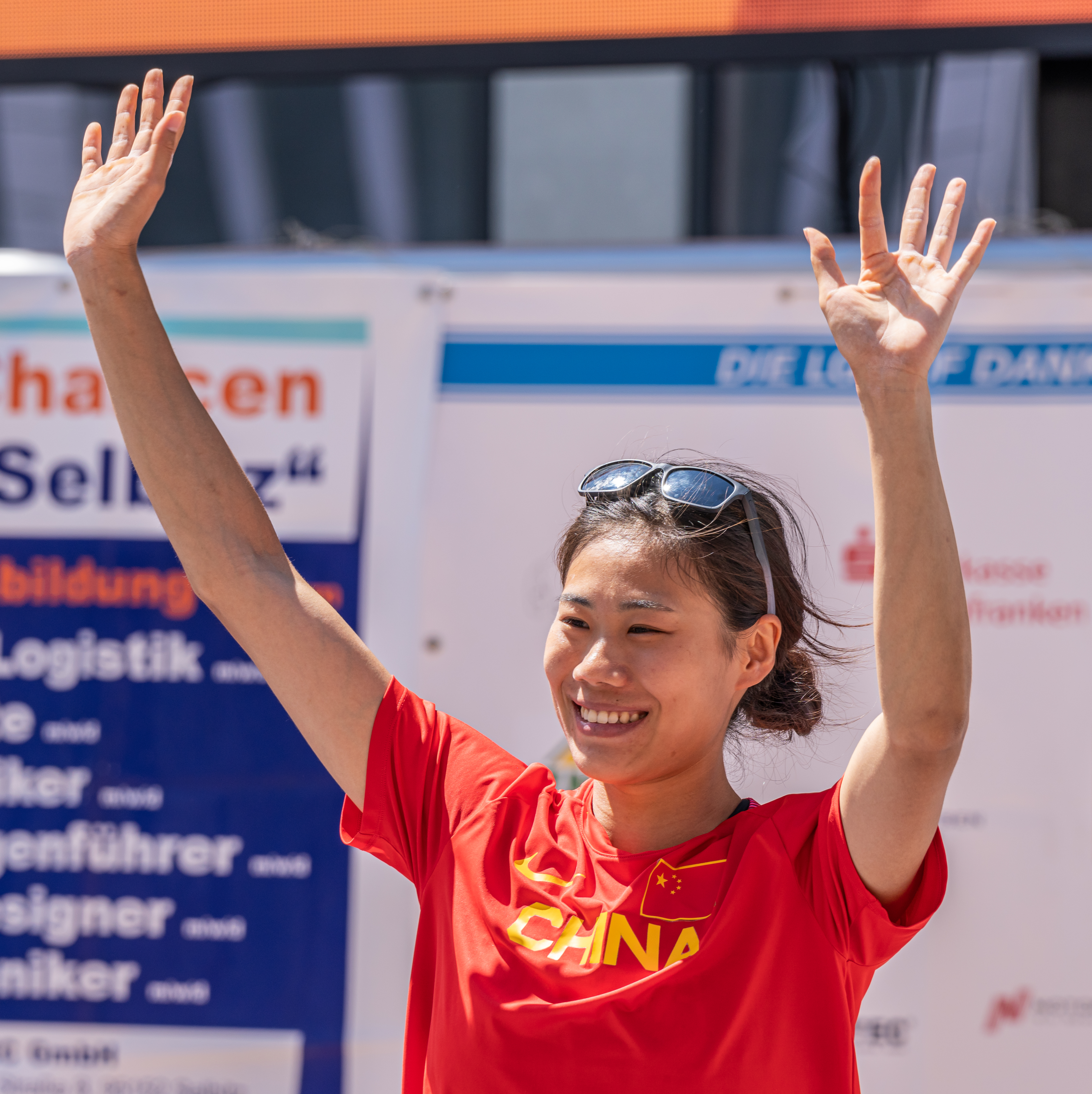
- Niu in Hof (Saale) (2025)

Personal information
- Born: 14 February 2000 (age 26)

Sport
- Sport: Athletics
- Event: Pole vault

Achievements and titles
- Personal bests: Pole Vault: 4.62m (Xiamen, 2023)
Medal record
Women's athletics
Representing China
Asian Games
Bronze medal – third place	2022 Hangzhou	Pole vault
Asian Championships
Gold medal – first place	2025 Gumi	Pole vault
Silver medal – second place	2023 Bangkok	Pole vault
Asian Indoor Athletics Championships
Gold medal – first place	2026 Tianjin	Pole vault
Silver medal – second place	2024 Tehran	Pole vault
World Youth Championships
Gold medal – first place	2017 Nairobi	Pole vault

Niu Chunge (born 14 February 2000) is a Chinese pole vaulter. She has won Chinese national titles indoors and outdoors as well as the 2025 Asian Athletics Championships.

== Biography ==
She won the World U18 Championships in Nairobi in 2017 with a personal best clearance of 4.20 metres. She competed at the 2018 IAAF World U20 Championships in Tampere, placing sixth overall with a clearance of 4.25 metres.

She won the Chinese indoor title in Tianjin in February 2023. She won the Chinese outdoor national title in Shenyang in June 2023. She won silver at the 2023 Asian Championships in Bangkok with a clearance of 4.51 metres. She competed at the 2023 World Athletics Championships in Budapest, clearing 4.50 metres but not making the final. She won bronze at the delayed 2022 Asian Games in Hangzhou in October 2023.

She won silver at the Asian Indoor Championships in Tehran in February 2024 with a clearance of 4.41 metres. She subsequently competed in the pole vault at the 2024 Paris Olympics.

In May 2025, she won the gold medal at the 2025 Asian Athletics Championships. She was a finalist at the 2025 World Athletics Championships in Tokyo, Japan, in September 2025, placing eleventh overall.

In February 2026, she won the gold medal in the pole vault at the 2026 Asian Indoor Athletics Championships in Tianjin, China. In September, she won the silver medal at the 2026 Asian Games in Nagoya, Japan, clearing 4.50 metres.
