= Zhou Yang (pole vaulter) =

Chinese pole vaulter

Zhou Yang (Chinese: 周扬, born 16 May 1988 in Chengdu, Sichuan) is a female Chinese pole vaulter.

She won the 2006 World Junior Championships and finished eighth at the 2007 Summer Universiade. She will represent her country at the 2008 Summer Olympics.

Her personal best jump is 4.45 metres, achieved in June 2008 in Suzhou.
