= Choi Yun-hee =

South Korean pole vaulter

Personal information
- Born: May 28, 1986 (age 40)
- Height: 1.72 m (5 ft 7 1/2 in)
- Weight: 62 kg (137 lb)

Sport
- Country: South Korea
- Sport: Athletics
- Event: Pole Vault
Medal record
Asian Championships
Bronze medal – third place	2009 Guangzhou	Pole vault
Asian Indoor Championships
Silver medal – second place	2012 Hangzhou	Pole vault
- Updated on 6 August 2012

Choi Yun-hee (Korean: 최윤희; born 25 May 1986) is a South Korean track and field athlete who competes in the women's pole vault. She has represented her country internationally, including a medal at the Asian Athletics Championships in 2009. Her personal best of 4.40 m is the national record and she had straight wins in the pole vault at the Korean National Sports Festival from 2004 to 2010.

She began competing as a junior athlete in 2000 and made her breakthrough in 2004 at the age of eighteen by setting a national record of 3.82 metres to win at the Korean National Sports Festival. She retained her title the following year and also made her first international appearances for her country, coming fifth at the 2005 East Asian Games and fourth at the 2005 Asian Athletics Championships in a new record 4.05 m (becoming the first Korean woman over four metres). She added a further five centimetres to her best mark to win at the 2006 National Festival and went on to finish fifth at the 2006 Asian Games.

Choi set a national indoor record over the four-metre mark with a clearance of 4.02 m in Japan. Outdoors, she took a fourth straight win at the National Games and was first at the Korean University Championships. The 2008 National Festival saw her reach new heights as she pushed the national record to 4.16 m. Her national mark was bettered by Lim Eun-Ji the following April, but it was Choi who took the national title later that year. She represented South Korea at the 2009 Summer Universiade and was the bronze medallist in the pole vault at the 2009 Asian Athletics Championships in November, reaching the podium at an international championship for the first time.

Choi extended her winning streak at the National Festival to seven at the 2010 edition. She was fifth at the 2010 Asian Games, making her second appearance at the competition. In 2011, she won the national title and regained her Korean record from rival Lim, clearing 4.40 m for the first time.
