= Rachel Yang =

Singaporean pole vaulter

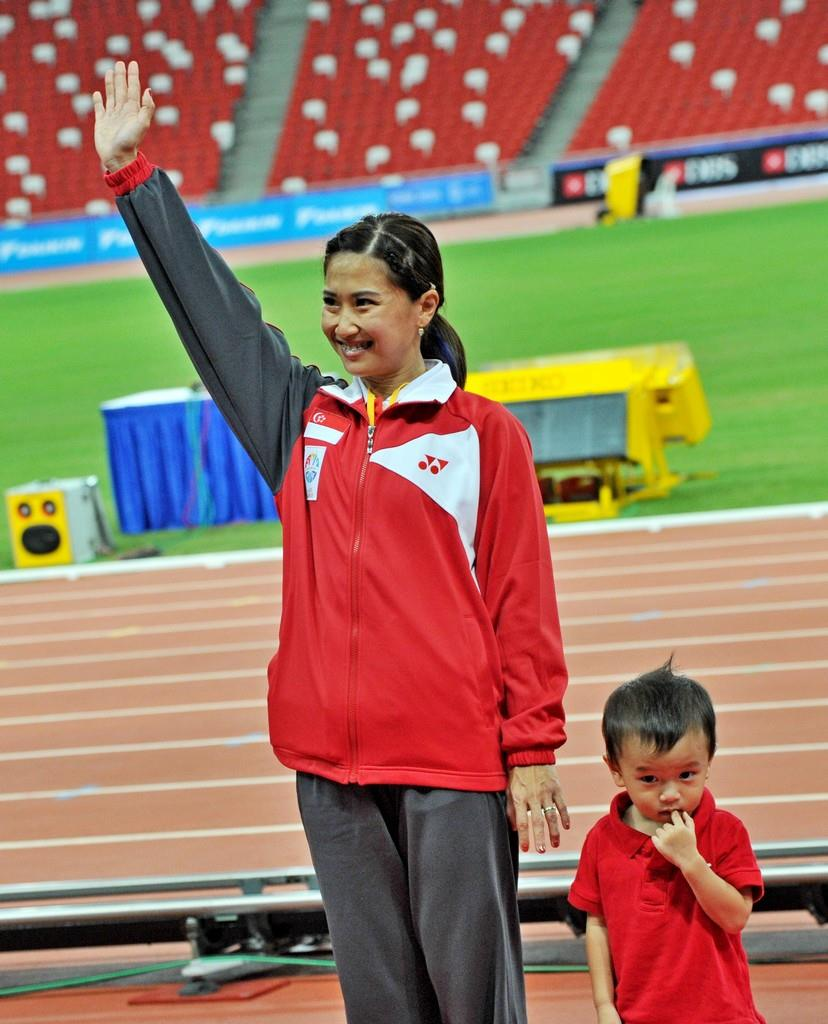
- Yang and her son, Zacchaeus, on the podium at 2015 SEA Games.

Personal information
- National team: Singapore
- Born: 28 February 1982 (age 44) Singapore
- Height: 1.57 m (5 ft 2 in)
- Weight: 48 kg (106 lb)

Sport
- Country: Singapore
- Sport: Athletics
- Event: Pole vault
Medal record
Women's Athletics
Representing Singapore
Asian Championships
Silver medal – second place	2007 Amman	Pole vault
Asian Indoor Games
Bronze medal – third place	2007 Macau	Pole vault
South East Asian Games
Silver medal – second place	2015 Singapore	Pole vault
Bronze medal – third place	2017 Kuala Lumpur	Pole vault

Rachel Isabel Yang Bingjie (Chinese: 杨冰洁, born 28 February 1982) is a Singaporean pole vaulter.

== Career ==
Yang started pole vaulting in 2006 but suffered a career ending spinal injury in 2009. In 2010, she made an unexpected return, breaking her previous national record of 3.75m with a new mark of 3.81m, making her the first Singaporean to qualify for this event at the Asian Games.

Yang briefly retired in 2012 after marrying her coach, David Yeo. She made a comeback in 2015 after giving birth to her first child in 2013, winning Singapore's first medal in the 28th South East Asian Games with a new national record of 3.90 m.

Yang broke her own and the national record with a jump of 3.91m at the Thammasat University Sport Complex during the 2017 Thailand Open Track and Field Championships. She won the gold medal despite suffering from an anterior cruciate ligament (ACL) injury in July 2016 and an injured heel just two weeks before the Championships.

Career progression

Year	Height	Competition, Venue
2007	3.50m	Asian Athletic C'ship, Jordan
2008	3.60m	Taiwan Open, Chinese Taipei
2009	3.75m	Negeri Sembilan Open, Malaysia
2010	3.81m	SAA Pole Vault Series, Singapore
2011	3.82m	SAA Pole Vault Series, Singapore
2015	3.83m	Malaysia Open, Malaysia
2015	3.85m	Taiwan Open, Chinese Taipei
2015	3.90m	SEA Games, Singapore
2017	3.91m	Thailand Open, Thailand
