= Li Ling (pole vaulter) =

Chinese pole vaulter

Personal information
- Born: July 6, 1989 (age 37) Puyang, Henan, China
- Height: 1.85 m (6 ft 1 in)
- Weight: 59 kg (130 lb)

Sport
- Country: China
- Sport: Athletics
- Event: Pole Vault
Medal record
Women's athletics
Representing China
Asian Games
Gold medal – first place	2014 Incheon	Pole vault
Gold medal – first place	2018 Jakarta-Palembang	Pole vault
Gold medal – first place	2022 Hangzhou	Pole vault
Silver medal – second place	2010 Guangzhou	Pole vault
Asian Indoor Championships
Gold medal – first place	2012 Hangzhou	Pole vault
Gold medal – first place	2016 Doha	Pole vault
Gold medal – first place	2024 Tehran	Pole vault

Li Ling (Chinese: 李玲; pinyin: Lǐ Líng; born 6 July 1989) is a Chinese athlete, who specialises in the pole vault.

She competed at the 2006 World Junior Championships, but no-heighted in the final. She achieved indoor and outdoor personal bests in 2008, clearing 4.45 metres indoors in Beijing in February and repeating the feat outdoors two months later in Hangzhou.

She represented her country at the 2008 Summer Olympics but her mark of 4.15 m in the qualifying round was not enough to progress to the final. She fared better at the 2009 World Championships in Athletics, but her season's best mark of 4.40 m was ten centimetres off making the final competition.

She matched her personal best to take the gold medal at the 2009 Asian Indoor Games. The vault was one centimetre off Zhang Yingning's Asian record in the event.

On September 8, 2013, she achieved a new Asian record at the Chinese National Games in Shenyang, China with 4.65 m.

Since then Li had achieved Asian record in women's pole vault for another 3 times —— first time was 2015 Asian Athletics Championships in Wuhan which she raised her record by one centimeter to 4.66m, second time was 2016 Asian Indoor Athletics Championships in Doha she became the first Asian female pole vaulter to cross the height of 4.70m, last time in 2019 Diamond League Shanghai she finished second with 4.72m, a record that stands till now.

Li won the women's pole vault event at the 2014 IAAF Continental Cup with mark of 4.55m, remarkably, this was the sole first-place finish for Asia-Pacific team at that tournament.

After 4 consecutive Olympics appearances, Li suddenly withdrew from 2024 Olympic Games before Team China's departure to France due to a ruptured Achilles tendon.

== Career ==
Year	Competition	Venue	Position	Notes
Representing China
2006	World Junior Championships	Beijing, China	1st (q)	4.00 m
2007	Asian Championships	Amman, Jordan	–	NM
2008	Olympic Games	Beijing, China	27th (q)	4.15 m
2009	Universiade	Belgrade, Serbia	6th	4.30 m
2009	World Championships	Berlin, Germany	18th (q)	4.40 m
2009	Asian Indoor Games	Hanoi, Vietnam	1st	4.45 m
2009	East Asian Games	Hong Kong, China	2nd	4.05 m
2010	World Indoor Championships	Doha, Qatar	16th (q)	4.20 m
2010	Asian Games	Guangzhou, China	2nd	4.30 m
2011	Asian Championships	Kobe, Japan	2nd	4.30 m
2011	Universiade	Shenzhen, China	–	NM
2011	World Championships	Daegu, South Korea	29th (q)	4.25 m
2012	Asian Indoor Championships	Hangzhou, China	1st	4.50 m
2012	Olympic Games	London, United Kingdom	30th (q)	4.25 m
2013	Asian Championships	Pune, India	1st	4.54 m
2013	World Championships	Moscow, Russia	11th	4.45 m
2014	Continental Cup	Marrakesh, Morocco	1st	4.55 m
2014	Asian Games	Incheon, South Korea	1st	4.35 m
2015	Asian Championships	Wuhan, China	1st	4.66 m AR
2015	Universiade	Gwangju, South Korea	1st	4.45 m
2015	World Championships	Beijing, China	9th	4.60 m
2016	Asian Indoor Championships	Doha, Qatar	1st	4.70 m AR
2016	Olympic Games	Rio de Janeiro, Brazil	16th (q)	4.55 m
2017	Asian Championships	Bhubaneswar, India	2nd	4.20 m
2018	Asian Games	Jakarta, Indonesia	1st	4.60 m
2019	Asian Championships	Doha, Qatar	1st	4.61 m
2019	World Championships	Doha, Qatar	13th	4.50 m
2021	Olympic Games	Tokyo, Japan	–	NM
2022	World Championships	Eugene, United States	6th	4.60 m
2023	Asian Championships	Bangkok, Thailand	1st	4.66 m
2023	World Championships	Budapest, Hungary	13th (q)	4.60 m
2023	Asian Games	Hangzhou, China	1st	4.63 m
2024	Asian Indoor Championships	Tehran, Iran	1st	4.51 m
2024	World Indoor Championships	Glasgow, United Kingdom	11th	4.40 m

== Personal bests ==
Event	Best (m)	Venue	Date
Pole vault (outdoor)	4.72 (AR)	Shanghai, China	18 May 2019
Pole vault (indoor)	4.70 (AR)	Doha, Qatar	19 February 2016

- All information taken from IAAF profile.
