= Lim Eun-ji =

South Korean pole vaulter (born 1989)

Lim Eun-Ji
Personal information
- Nationality: South Korean
- Born: April 2, 1989 (age 37) Seoul, South Korea
- Height: 1.74 m (5 ft 9 in)

Sport
- Country: South Korea
- Sport: Track and field
- Event: Pole vault

Achievements and titles
- Personal bests: outdoor: 4.35 m (2009, NR) indoor: 4.24 m (2009, NR)
Medal record
Athletics
Representing South Korea
Asian Games
| Bronze medal – third place | 2018 Jakarta | Pole vault |
East Asian Games
| Gold medal – first place | 2009 Hong Kong | Pole vault |
- Updated on 28 April 2009

Lim Eun-ji (Korean: 임은지; born 2 April 1989) is a South Korean pole vaulter. She is the current South Korean national record holder in the event indoors and a former outdoor record holder.

Having previously competed in the 100 metres hurdles, triple jump, and heptathlon, Lim competed in the pole vault for the first time in December 2007. She quickly improved over a period of ten months, breaking the national junior record in Gwangju with a vault of 4.10 metres in October 2008. She soon began challenging the senior records, taking the indoor national record with a jump of 4.24 m in March 2009.

At the Corporate Teams' National Competitions on 28 April 2009, Lim broke Choi Yun-Hee's outdoor record of 4.16 m by some distance, vaulting a height of 4.35 m. This record also made her eligible to compete at the 2009 World Championships in Berlin. She finished bottom of her group with a best clearance of 4.10 m at the 2009 World Championships, but she went on to win the gold medal at the 2009 East Asian Games later that year.

She failed a drug test in Korea in July 2010, testing positive for the diuretics hydrochlorothiazide and chlorothiazide. She received a three-month ban for the infraction.

== Personal bests ==
| Event | Date | Venue | Height |
|---|---|---|---|
| Pole vault (indoor) | 26 March 2009 | Caotun, Chinese Taipei | 4.24 metres NR |
| Pole vault (outdoor) | 28 April 2009 | Andong, South Korea | 4.35 metres NR |

- All information taken from IAAF Profile.

== See also ==
- List of doping cases in athletics
