= 2013 World Youth Championships in Athletics – Girls' pole vault =

Girls' pole vault at the 2013 World Youth Championships in Athletics
- Venue: RSC Olimpiyskiy
- Dates: 11 July (qualification); 13 July (final)
- Competitors: 26
- Winning height: 4.25

Medalists
gold medal	Robeilys Peinado	Venezuela
silver medal	Alyona Lutkovskaya	Russia
bronze medal	Krista Obižajeva	Latvia

The girls' pole vault at the 2013 World Youth Championships in Athletics was held on 11 and 13 July.

== Medalists ==
Gold	Silver	Bronze
Robeilys Peinado; Venezuela	Alyona Lutkovskaya; Russia	Krista Obižajeva; Latvia

== Records ==
Prior to the competition, the following records were as follows.

World Youth Best	Angelica Bengtsson (SWE)	4.47	Moscow, Russia	22 May 2010
Championship Record	Vicky Parnov (AUS)	4.35	Ostrava, Czech Republic	14 July 2007
World Youth Leading	Robeilys Peinado (VEN)	4.35	Barquisimeto, Venezuela	24 May 2013

== Qualification ==
Qualification rule: 3.90 (Q) or at least 12 best performers (q) qualified.

Rank	Group	Name	Nationality	3.40	3.55	3.65	3.75	3.85	3.90	Result	Notes
1	B	Alyona Lutkovskaya	Russia	–	–	–	–	–	o	3.90	Q
1	B	Lene Retzius	Norway	o	–	o	o	o	o	3.90	Q, PB
1	A	Reena Koll	Estonia	–	–	–	–	–	o	3.90	Q
4	B	Desiree Freier	United States	–	–	o	o	xo	o	3.90	Q
4	B	Krista Obižajeva	Latvia	–	–	–	xo	o	o	3.90	Q
6	B	Nina Kennedy	Australia	–	–	–	–	xxo	o	3.90	Q
7	A	Zoe McKinley	United States	–	o	o	xxo	xxo	o	3.90	Q
8	A	Robeilys Peinado	Venezuela	–	–	–	o	–	xo	3.90	Q
8	B	Kamila Przybyła	Poland	–	–	o	o	o	xo	3.90	Q
10	A	Eliza McCartney	New Zealand	–	–	o	xxo	o	xo	3.90	Q
11	B	Mallaury Sautereau	France	–	o	o	o	o	xxo	3.90	Q, PB
12	A	Noelina Madarieta	Argentina	–	–	–	xxo	xo	xxo	3.90	Q
13	B	Franziska Heiß	Germany	–	o	o	o	o	xxx	3.85	
14	A	Ria Möllers	Germany	–	xo	xxo	xo	o	xxx	3.85	
15	A	Demet Parlak	Turkey	o	–	xxo	o	xxx		3.75	
16	A	Leda Krošelj	Slovenia	xo	xo	xo	o	xxx		3.75	
17	A	Emma Philippe	Australia	–	–	o	xo	xxx		3.75	
18	B	Francesca Semeraro	Italy	xo	xxo	o	xxx			3.65	
19	B	Juliana Campos	Brazil	o	o	xxx				3.55	
20	A	Soňa Krajňáková	Slovakia	xo	xxx					3.40	
	B	Brenda Czermak	Mexico	xxx						NM	
	A	Emma Li	Canada	xxx						NM	
	B	Giseth Montaño	Colombia	–	–	–	xxx			NM	
	A	Kseniya Novikova	Russia	–	xxx					NM	
	A	Olha Zyuzina	Ukraine	–	–	–	–	xxx		NM	
	B	Viktoriya Filina	Ukraine	xxx						NM	

== Final ==
Rank	Name	Nationality	3.65	3.80	3.95	4.05	4.15	4.20	4.25	4.30	4.36	Result	Notes
1st place, gold medalist(s)	Robeilys Peinado	Venezuela	–	o	xo	xo	o	o	o	x–	xx	4.25	
2nd place, silver medalist(s)	Alyona Lutkovskaya	Russia	–	–	o	–	o	x–	x–	x		4.15	
3rd place, bronze medalist(s)	Krista Obižajeva	Latvia	–	o	xxo	o	xxx					4.05	
4	Eliza McCartney	New Zealand	–	o	o	xo	xxx					4.05	
5	Nina Kennedy	Australia	–	–	xo	xxo	xxx					4.05	
5	Noelina Madarieta	Argentina	o	o	xo	xxo	xxx					4.05	
7	Kamila Przybyła	Poland	xo	o	xxo	xxo	xxx					4.05	PB
8	Lene Retzius	Norway	o	o	xo	xxx						3.95	PB
9	Desiree Freier	United States	–	xo	xo	xxx						3.95	
10	Reena Koll	Estonia	–	o	–	xxx						3.80	
11	Zoe McKinley	United States	xo	o	xxx							3.80	
12	Mallaury Sautereau	France	o	xxx								3.65	
