= 2014 World Junior Championships in Athletics – Women's pole vault =

The women's pole vault event at the 2014 World Junior Championships in Athletics was held in Eugene, Oregon, USA, at Hayward Field on 22 and 24 July.

== Medalists ==
Gold	Alena Lutkovskaya; Russia
Silver	Desiree Freier; United States
Bronze	Eliza McCartney; New Zealand

== Records ==
Standing records prior to the 2014 World Junior Championships in Athletics
World Junior Record	Angelica Bengtsson (SWE)	4.63	Stockholm, Sweden	22 February 2011
Championship Record	Angelica Bengtsson (SWE)	4.50	Barcelona, Spain	14 July 2012
World Junior Leading	Alayna Lutkovskaya (RUS)	4.46	Tomblaine, France	27 June 2014
Broken records during the 2014 World Junior Championships in Athletics

== Results ==
=== Final ===
24 July
Start time: 17:59 Temperature: 23 °C Humidity: 47 %
End time: 20:27 Temperature: 21 °C Humidity: 53 %

Rank	Name	Nationality	Attempts											Result	Notes
Rank	Name	Nationality	3.80	3.95	4.10	4.20	4.25	4.30	4.35	4.40	4.45	4.50	4.57	Result	Notes
1st place, gold medalist(s)	Alena Lutkovskaya	Russia	-	-	-	o	-	-	xo	-	o	xo	xr	4.50	CR
2nd place, silver medalist(s)	Desiree Freier	United States	-	-	o	o	o	o	o	xo	o	xxx		4.45	AJR
3rd place, bronze medalist(s)	Eliza McCartney	New Zealand	-	-	o	o	-	xo	xo	xo	xo	xxx		4.45	NR
4	Nina Kennedy	Australia	-	o	o	xo	-	xxo	o	o	xxx			4.40	PB
5	Anastasiya Sadovnikova	Russia	-	-	xo	xo	xo	xxx						4.25	SB
6	Rebeka Silhanová	Czech Republic	-	xo	o	o	xxo	xxx						4.25	
7	Elienor Werner	Sweden	o	o	o	xo	xxx							4.20	PB
8	Reena Koll	Estonia	o	o	o	xxo	xxx							4.20	NJR
9	Ninon Guillon-Romarin	France	-	o	o	xxx								4.10	
9	Elina Lampela	Finland	o	o	o	xxx								4.10	PB
11	Bonnie Draxler	United States	-	o	xxx									3.95	
12	Dominique Esselaar	Netherlands	xo	o	xxx									3.95	
12	Yeoryía Stefanídi	Greece	xo	o	xxx									3.95	
	Emma Philippe	Australia												DNS	

=== Qualifications ===
22 July
With qualifying standard of 4.15 (Q) or at least the 12 best performers (q) advance to the Final

==== Summary ====
Rank	Name	Nationality	Result	Notes
1	Alena Lutkovskaya	Russia	4.10	q
1	Anastasiya Sadovnikova	Russia	4.10	q
1	Ninon Guillon-Romarin	France	4.10	q
1	Rebeka Silhanová	Czech Republic	4.10	q
5	Bonnie Draxler	United States	4.10	q
5	Dominique Esselaar	Netherlands	4.10	q PB
7	Elina Lampela	Finland	4.10	q PB
7	Nina Kennedy	Australia	4.10	q
9	Elienor Werner	Sweden	4.10	q
9	Eliza McCartney	New Zealand	4.10	q
11	Desiree Freier	United States	4.10	q
12	Emma Philippe	Australia	4.00	q
12	Reena Koll	Estonia	4.00	q
12	Yeoryía Stefanídi	Greece	4.00	q SB
15	Lene Onsrud Retzius	Norway	4.00	
15	Malen Ruíz de Azúa	Spain	4.00	
17	Kamila Przybyła	Poland	4.00	
18	Maryna Kylypko	Ukraine	4.00	
19	Rebecca Pietsch	Germany	3.90	
20	Gil Le Bris	France	3.90	
21	Demet Parlak	Turkey	3.90	
21	Klara Mattson	Sweden	3.90	
23	Margaux Quirin	Belgium	3.90	
24	Helen Falda	Italy	3.90	
25	Wilma Murto	Finland	3.75	
26	Paula Nedberget Llano	Norway	3.75	
27	Allison Harris	Canada	3.75	
28	Li Chaoqun	China	3.75	
28	Leda Krošelj	Slovenia	3.75	
	Robeilys Peinado	Venezuela	NM	

==== Details ====
With qualifying standard of 4.15 (Q) or at least the 12 best performers (q) advance to the Final

===== Group A =====
24 July
Start time; 10:31 Temperature: 18 °C Humidity: 73 %
End time: 12:16 Temperature: 22 °C Humidity: 53 %

Rank	Name	Nationality	Attempts						Result	Notes
Rank	Name	Nationality	3.60	3.75	3.90	4.00	4.10	4.15	Result	Notes
1	Alena Lutkovskaya	Russia	-	-	-	-	o		4.10	q
1	Rebeka Silhanová	Czech Republic	-	-	o	-	o		4.10	q
3	Bonnie Draxler	United States	-	o	xxo	xo	o		4.10	q
3	Dominique Esselaar	Netherlands	xo	o	xxo	o	o		4.10	q PB
5	Reena Koll	Estonia	-	-	o	o	xxx		4.00	q
5	Emma Philippe	Australia	-	o	o	o	xxx		4.00	q
5	Yeoryía Stefanídi	Greece	o	o	o	o	xxx		4.00	q SB
8	Kamila Przybyła	Poland	-	xo	xxo	xo	xxx		4.00	
9	Rebecca Pietsch	Germany	-	o	o	xxx			3.90	
10	Gil Le Bris	France	-	xo	o	xxx			3.90	
11	Klara Mattson	Sweden	o	xxo	o	xxx			3.90	
11	Demet Parlak	Turkey	xo	xo	o	xxx			3.90	
13	Wilma Murto	Finland	o	o	xxx				3.75	
14	Paula Nedberget Llano	Norway	xo	o	xxx				3.75	
	Robeilys Peinado	Venezuela	-	xxx					NM	

===== Group B =====
24 July
Start time; 10:30 Temperature: 18 °C Humidity: 73 %
End time: 12:13 Temperature: 23 °C Humidity: 50 %

Rank	Name	Nationality	Attempts						Result	Notes
Rank	Name	Nationality	3.60	3.75	3.90	4.00	4.10	4.15	Result	Notes
1	Ninon Guillon-Romarin	France	-	-	o	o	o		4.10	q
1	Anastasiya Sadovnikova	Russia	-	-	-	o	o		4.10	q
3	Nina Kennedy	Australia	-	-	o	o	xo		4.10	q
3	Elina Lampela	Finland	-	o	o	o	xo		4.10	q PB
5	Eliza McCartney	New Zealand	-	-	-	xo	xo		4.10	q
5	Elienor Werner	Sweden	-	o	xo	o	xo		4.10	q
7	Desiree Freier	United States	-	-	-	-	xxo		4.10	q
8	Lene Onsrud Retzius	Norway	-	-	xxo	o	xxx		4.00	
8	Malen Ruíz de Azúa	Spain	o	o	xxo	o	xxx		4.00	
10	Maryna Kylypko	Ukraine	-	xo	xo	xxo	xxx		4.00	
11	Margaux Quirin	Belgium	-	o	xo	xxx			3.90	
12	Helen Falda	Italy	o	o	xxo	xxx			3.90	
13	Allison Harris	Canada	xxo	o	xxx				3.75	
14	Leda Krošelj	Slovenia	o	xo	xxx				3.75	
14	Li Chaoqun	China	-	xo	xxx				3.75	

== Participation ==
According to an unofficial count, 30 athletes from 23 countries participated in the event.

- Australia (2)
- Belgium (1)
- Canada (1)
- China (1)
- Czech Republic (1)
- Estonia (1)
- Finland (2)
- France (2)
- Germany (1)
- Greece (1)
- Italy (1)
- Netherlands (1)
- New Zealand (1)
- Norway (2)
- Poland (1)
- Russia (2)
- Slovenia (1)
- Spain (1)
- Sweden (2)
- Turkey (1)
- Ukraine (1)
- United States (2)
- Venezuela (1)
