= 2015 World Youth Championships in Athletics – Girls' pole vault =

Girls' pole vault at the 2015 World Youth Championships in Athletics
- Venue: Estadio Olímpico Pascual Guerrero
- Dates: 16 and 18 July
- Competitors: 19 from 14 nations
- Winning height: 4.26

Medalists
gold medal	Elienor Werner	Sweden
silver medal	Phillipa Hajdasz	Australia
silver medal	Chen Qiaoling	China

The girls' pole vault at the 2015 World Youth Championships in Athletics was held at the Estadio Olímpico Pascual Guerrero in Cali, Colombia on 16 and 18 July 2015.

== Records ==
Prior to the competition, the following records were as follows.

World Youth Best	Angelica Bengtsson (SWE)	4.47	Moscow, Russia	22 May 2010
Championship Record	Vicky Parnov (AUS)	4.35	Ostrava, Czech Republic	14 July 2007
World Youth Leading	Lisa Gunnarsson (SWE)	4.25	Blois, France	1 July 2015

== Results ==
=== Qualification ===
With qualifying standard of 3.95 (Q) or at least the 12 best performers (q) advance to the final.

Rank	Group	Name	Nationality	3.40	3.55	3.70	3.80	3.90	3.95	Mark	Notes
1	B	Elienor Werner	Sweden	–	–	–	o	o		3.90	q
1	B	Phillipa Hajdasz	Australia	–	–	o	o	o		3.90	q
1	A	Chen Qiaoling	China	–	o	o	o	o		3.90	q
1	A	Tamara Schaßberger	Germany	–	–	o	o	o		3.90	q
5	B	Stina Seidler	Germany	–	–	o	xo	o		3.90	q
6	B	Carson Dingler	United States	xxo	o	o	o	o		3.90	q
7	B	Valeriya Nikonova	Russia	o	o	o	o	xo		3.90	q
8	A	Hanne De Baene	Belgium	–	o	xxo	o	xxo		3.90	q
9	B	Wu Zuocheng	China	xo	xxo	o	o	xxx		3.80	q, PB
10	A	Nikola Pöschlová	Czech Republic	o	o	o	xo	xxx		3.80	q
11	A	Rachel Baxter	United States	xo	o	o	xo	xxx		3.80	q
12	A	Nastja Modic	Slovenia	xxo	o	o	xo	xxx		3.80	q
13	B	Agnieszka Kaszuba	Poland	o	o	o	xxo	xxx		3.80	
14	B	Alicia Raso	Spain	–	–	xxo	xxo	xxx		3.80	
15	A	Büşra Pekşirin	Turkey	o	xo	o	xxx			3.70	
16	B	Makiah Hunt	Canada	–	o	xxo	xxx			3.70	
17	A	Paula Arellano	Colombia	o	o	xxx				3.55	PB
–	A	Paula Arellano	Spain	–	xxx					NM	
–	A	Elizaveta Bondarenko	Russia	–	xxx					NM	

=== Final ===
Rank	Name	Nationality	3.70	3.85	3.95	4.05	4.15	4.22	4.26	4.30	Mark	Notes
1st place, gold medalist(s)	Elienor Werner	Sweden	–	o	o	o	o	o	xxo	xx–	4.26	WYL
2nd place, silver medalist(s)	Chen Qiaoling	China	o	o	o	o	xxx				4.05	PB
2nd place, silver medalist(s)	Phillipa Hajdasz	Australia	o	o	o	o	xxx				4.05	PB
4	Valeriya Nikonova	Russia	xxo	o	xo	xo	xxx				4.05	PB
5	Hanne De Baene	Belgium	o	xo	o	xxo	xxx				4.05	
6	Stina Seidler	Germany	o	o	xxo	xxx					3.95	
7	Tamara Schaßberger	Germany	o	xxo	xxo	xxx					3.95	
8	Wu Zuocheng	China	o	o	xxx						3.85	PB
9	Rachel Baxter	United States	xo	o	xxx						3.85	
10	Carson Dingler	United States	xxo	o	xxx						3.85	
11	Nastja Modic	Slovenia	xo	xo	xxx						3.85	PB
12	Nikola Pöschlová	Czech Republic	xo	xxo	xxx						3.85	
