= 2016 IAAF World U20 Championships – Women's pole vault =

The women's pole vault event at the 2016 IAAF World U20 Championships was held at Zdzisław Krzyszkowiak Stadium on 19 and 21 July.

== Medalists ==
Gold	Angelica Moser; Switzerland
Silver	Robeilys Peinado; Venezuela
Bronze	Wilma Murto; Finland

== Records ==
Standing records prior to the 2016 IAAF World U20 Championships in Athletics
World Junior Record	Wilma Murto (FIN)	4.71	Zweibrücken, Germany	31 January 2016
Championship Record	Angelica Bengtsson (SWE)	4.50	Barcelona, Spain	14 July 2012
Championship Record	Alena Lutkovskaya (RUS)	4.50	Eugene, United States	24 July 2014
World Junior Leading	Robeilys Peinado (VEN)	4.56	Budapest, Hungary	10 June 2016

== Results ==
=== Qualification ===
Qualification: 4.20 (Q) or at least 12 best performers (q) qualified for the final.

Rank	Group	Name	Nationality	3.50	3.65	3.80	3.95	4.05	4.15	4.20	Result	Note
1	A	Angelica Moser	Switzerland	–	–	–	–	–	–	o	4.20	Q
1	A	Robeilys Peinado	Venezuela	–	–	–	–	–	–	o	4.20	Q
3	A	Alix Dehaynain	France	–	–	o	o	o	o	–	4.15	q, SB
3	B	Wilma Murto	Finland	–	–	–	–	–	o	–	4.15	q
5	A	Chen Qiaoling	China	–	–	–	xo	o	o	–	4.15	q
6	B	Rachel Baxter	United States	–	–	–	o	xxo	o	–	4.15	q
6	B	Thiziri Daci	France	–	o	xo	xo	o	o	–	4.15	q, PB
8	A	Carson Dingler	United States	–	o	o	o	o	xo	–	4.15	q
8	B	Li Chaoqun	China	–	–	–	o	o	xo	–	4.15	q
10	B	Lisa Gunnarsson	Sweden	–	–	–	–	xo	xo	–	4.15	q
10	B	Amálie Švábíková	Czech Republic	–	–	o	xo	o	xo	–	4.15	q
12	A	Klara Mattsson	Sweden	–	xo	o	o	xxo	xxo	–	4.15	q, PB
13	B	Tamara Schaßberger	Germany	–	o	o	o	o	xxx		4.05	SB
14	B	Andrea San José	Spain	–	o	o	xo	o	xxx		4.05	
15	A	Marijke Wijnmaalen	Netherlands	–	o	o	xxo	o	xxx		4.05	PB
16	B	Agnieszka Kaszuba	Poland	–	xo	o	xo	xo	xxx		4.05	
17	A	Nikola Pöschlová	Czech Republic	o	o	o	o	xxx			3.95	
17	B	Killiana Heymans	Netherlands	–	o	o	o	xxx			3.95	
19	B	Pascale Stöcklin	Switzerland	–	–	xo	o	xxx			3.95	
20	A	Miren Bartolomé	Spain	–	o	o	xxo	xxx			3.95	
21	A	Hanne De Baene	Belgium	–	–	o	xxx				3.80	
22	A	Ariadni Adamopoulou	Greece	o	xo	o	xxx				3.80	
22	B	Anna Shpak	Belarus	–	–	xo	–	xxx			3.80	
23	A	Margit Kalk	Estonia	xo	xxo	xo	xxx				3.80	
24	A	Luisa Schaar	Germany	–	xxo	xxx					3.65	
	A	Nina Kennedy	Australia	–	–	–	xxx				NM	
	B	Emma Philippe	Australia	–	–	xxx					NM	

=== Final ===
Rank	Name	Nationality	3.85	4.00	4.10	4.20	4.25	4.30	4.35	4.40	4.45	4.50	4.55	4.60	Result	Note
1st place, gold medalist(s)	Angelica Moser	Switzerland	–	–	–	xo	–	–	xxo	o	o	o	o	xr	4.55	CR
2nd place, silver medalist(s)	Robeilys Peinado	Venezuela	–	–	–	o	–	o	–	o	xxx				4.40	
3rd place, bronze medalist(s)	Wilma Murto	Finland	–	–	–	–	–	o	–	xxo	–	x–	x–	x	4.40	
4	Chen Qiaoling	China	–	o	–	o	–	xo	–	xxx					4.30	PB
5	Carson Dingler	United States	o	xo	o	xxo	o	xxx							4.25	PB
6	Li Chaoqun	China	–	o	xo	o	x–	xx							4.20	PB
7	Lisa Gunnarsson	Sweden	–	–	o	–	–	xxx							4.10	
7	Thiziri Daci	France	o	o	o	xxx									4.10	
7	Amálie Švábíková	Czech Republic	–	o	o	xxx									4.10	
10	Rachel Baxter	United States	–	xo	o	xxx									4.10	
11	Klara Mattsson	Sweden	o	o	xxx										4.00	
12	Alix Dehaynain	France	o	xxo	xxx										4.00	
