= 2014 Balkan Athletics Indoor Championships =

- Dates: 22 February
- Host city: Istanbul, Turkey
- Venue: Ataköy Athletics Arena
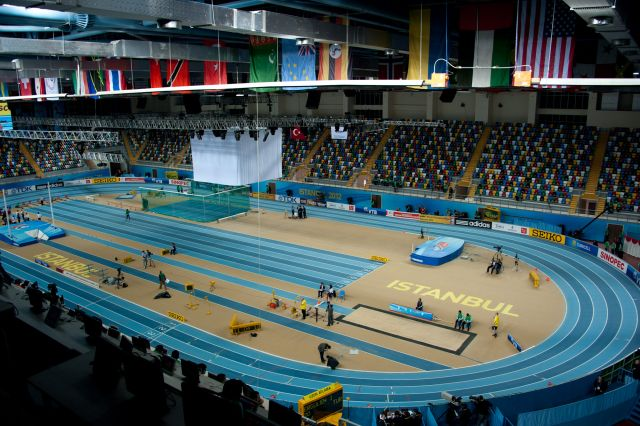
- Events: 24

The 2014 Balkan Athletics Indoor Championships was the 19th edition of the annual indoor track and field competition for athletes from the Balkans, organised by Balkan Athletics. It was held on 22 February at the Ataköy Athletics Arena in Istanbul, Turkey. Ivana Španović broke the Serbian indoor record to win the women's long jump with a mark of 6.92 m (22 ft 8 1/4 in).

== Results ==
=== Men ===
Event	Gold		Silver		Bronze	
60 metres	Efthímios Steryioúlis (GRE)	6.80	Bogdan Madaras (ROU)	6.86	Yiğitcan Hekimoğlu (TUR)	6.86
400 metres	Miloš Raović (SRB)	47.44	Yavuz Can (TUR)	47.76	Mateo Ružić (CRO)	47.99
800 metres	Nemanja Kojić (SRB)	1:51.05	Hasan Basri Güdük (TUR)	1:51.86	Halit Kiliç (TUR)	1:51.76
1500 metres	İlham Tanui Özbilen (TUR)	3:41.97	Mitja Krevs (SLO)	3:43.73 NR	Ioan Zaizan (ROU)	3:43.84
3000 metres	Ali Kaya (TUR)	7:52.15	Mitko Tsenov (BUL)	7:58.26	Tarık Langat Akdağ (TUR)	8:04.67
60 m hurdles	Konstadinos Douvalidis (GRE)	7.80	David Ilariani (GEO)	7.88	Cosmin Ilie Dumitrache (ROU)	8.10
High jump	Adonios Mastoras (GRE)	2.27 m	Miloš Todosijević (SRB)	2.21 m	Tihomir Ivanov (BUL)	2.19 m
Pole vault	Dimitrios Patsoukakis (GRE)	5.28 m	Nikandros Stylianou (CYP)	5.28 m	Andrej Poljanec (SLO)	5.22 m
Long jump	Dino Pervan (CRO)	7.76 m	Strahinja Jovančević (SRB)	7.62 m	Georgios Tsakonas (GRE)	7.52 m
Triple jump	Levon Aghasyan (ARM)	16.16 m	Lasha Torgvaidze (GEO)	16.15 m	Vladimir Letnicov (MDA)	16.04 m
Shot put	Asmir Kolašinac (SRB)	20.23 m	Andrei Gag (ROU)	20.17 m	Georgi Ivanov (BUL)	20.12 m

=== Women ===
Event	Gold		Silver		Bronze	
60 metres	Maria Gatou (GRE)	7.37	Andrea Ivančević (CRO)	7.44	Ramona Papaioannou (CYP)	7.45
400 metres	Bianca Răzor (ROU)	54.17	Liona Rebernik (SLO)	56.08	Emel Şanlı (TUR)	56.87
800 metres	Mihaela Nunu (ROU)	2:04.19	Gamze Bulut (TUR)	2:04.26	Florina Pierdevară (ROU)	2:04.69
1500 metres	Luiza Gega (ALB)	4:07.84 NR	Ancuța Bobocel (ROU)	4:18.13	Sonja Roman (SLO)	4:18.14
3000 metres	Emine Hatun Tuna (TUR)	9:15.36	Amela Terzić (SRB)	9:19.29	Cristina Casandra (ROU)	9:19.61
60 m hurdles	Marina Tomić (SRB)	8.16	Elisavet Pesiridou (GRE)	8.32	Anamaria Nesteriuc (ROU)	8.48
High jump	Ana Šimić (CRO)	1.94 m	Venelina Veneva-Mateeva (BUL)	1.90 m	Burcu Ayhan (TUR) Daniela Stanciu (ROU)	1.87 m
Pole vault	Lorela Manou (GRE)	4.36 m	Demet Parlak (TUR)	3.90 m	Jerneja Writzl (SLO)	3.80 m
Long jump	Ivana Španović (SRB)	6.92 m NR	Alina Rotaru (ROU)	6.45 m	Cornelia Deiac (ROU)	6.39 m
Triple jump	Cristina Sandu (ROU)	13.27 m	Büşra Mutay (TUR)	12.92 m	Satenik Hovhannisyan (ARM)	12.84 m
Shot put	Anca Heltne (ROU)	18.02 m	Radoslava Mavrodieva (BUL)	17.63 m	Emel Dereli (TUR)	16.96 m
