= Wilma Heltelä =

Finnish pole vaulter (born 1998)

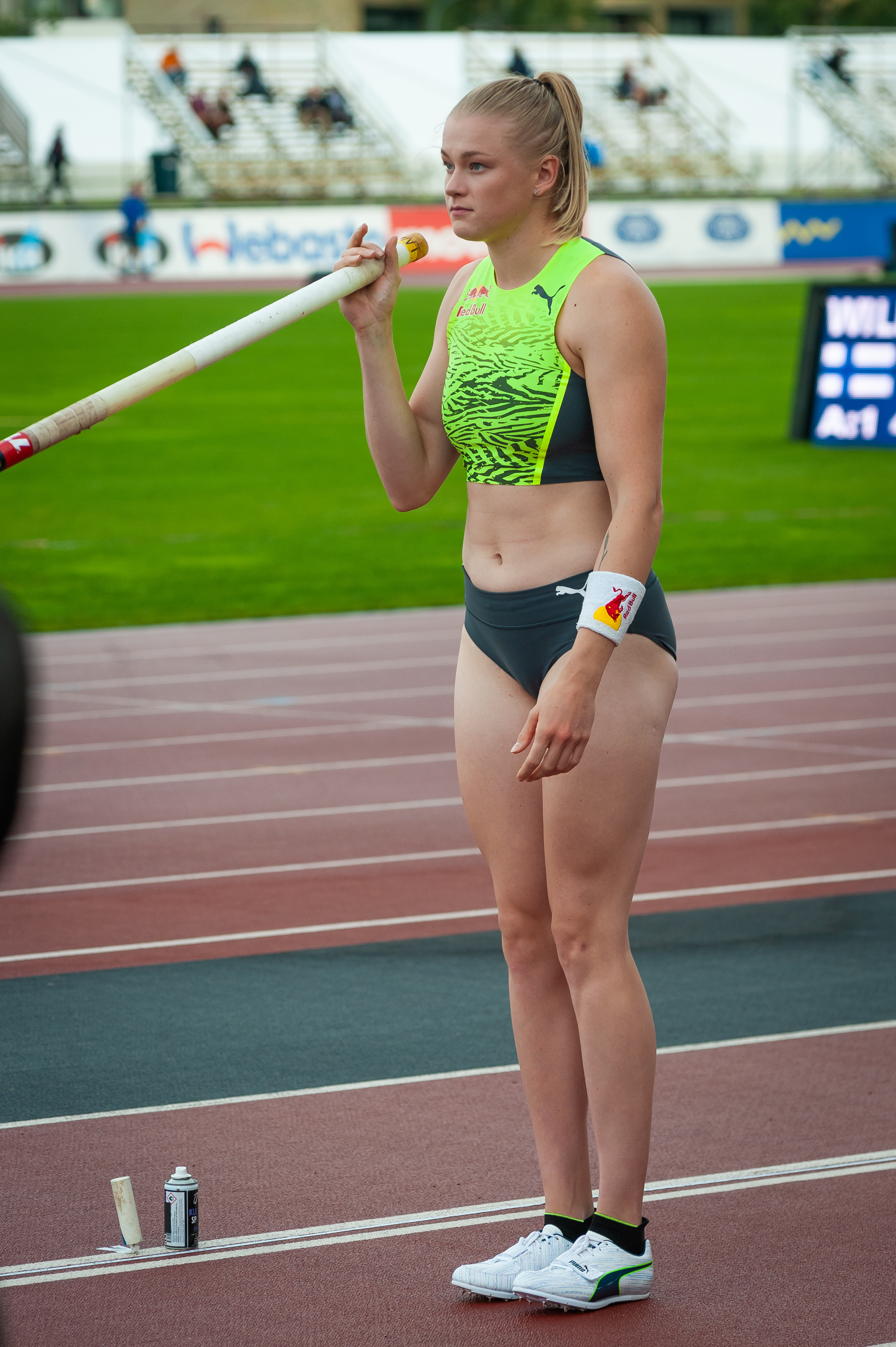
- Murto at the 2022 Finnish Athletics Championships in Joensuu

Personal information
- Born: Wilma Anna Helena Murto; June 11, 1998 (age 28) Kuusjoki, Finland

Sport
- Country: Finland
- Sport: Athletics
- Event: Pole vault
- Coached by: Jarno Koivunen

Achievements and titles
- Personal bests: 4.85 m NR (Munich 2022); Indoors; 4.80 mi NR (Istanbul 2023); 4.71 mi WU20R (Zweibrücken 2016)
Medal record
Women's athletics
Representing Finland
World Championships
Bronze medal – third place	2023 Budapest	Pole vault
European Championships
Gold medal – first place	2022 Munich	Pole vault
Silver medal – second place	2026 Birmingham	Pole vault
European Indoor Championships
Gold medal – first place	2023 Istanbul	Pole vault
European Games
Gold medal – first place	2023 Kraków-Małopolska	Pole vault
World U20 Championships
Bronze medal – third place	2016 Bydgoszcz	Pole vault
European U20 Championships
Bronze medal – third place	2017 Grosseto	Pole vault

Wilma Anna Helena Heltelä (née Murto; born 11 June 1998) is a Finnish pole vaulter. She won the gold medal at the 2022 European Athletics Championships in Munich with a jump of 4.85 m (15 ft 10 3/4 in), equalling the championships record and setting a new Finnish record. Heltelä also claimed victory at the 2023 European Indoor Championships, making her the first Finnish woman in history to win gold at these championships.

She was the 2016 World Under-20 Championships and 2017 European U20 Championships bronze medallist. Heltelä currently holds Finnish national records out and indoors and world U20 indoor record of 4.71 m (15 ft 5 1/4 in).

== Career ==
Wilma Heltelä made her international debut at the 2014 World Junior Championships in Athletics held in Eugene, Oregon at the age of sixteen. On 27 December 2015, she cleared a new best of 4.45 m (14 ft 7 in), which represented a European youth (under-18s) best.

On 31 January 2016, the 17-year-old set a new indoor world junior (under-20s) record in Zweibrücken, Germany, where she jumped 4.71 m (15 ft 5 1/4 in). This result was also a new Finnish national record, beating Minna Nikkanen's previous best by 11 centimetres (4.3 in).

In the following years, Heltelä struggled with form and it took her until the 2021 season to improve the record further, when she cleared 4.72 m (15 ft 5 3/4 in) at the Finnish Championships. Also in the same season, she finished fifth at the delayed 2020 Tokyo Olympics, her best senior championship result up to that point.

At the 2022 European Athletics Championships final, Heltelä cleared three Finnish records to take her first senior international championship medal, a gold. She improved her outdoor best with a remarkable 13 centimetres to 4.85 m (15 ft 10 3/4 in). This mark equalled also the championship record of Katerina Stefanidi, who took silver this time behind Heltelä. Also in 2022, she placed sixth at the World Championships in Eugene, Oregon.

On 7 January 2023, she improved her own 6-year-old Finnish indoor record, clearing world-leading 4.75 m (15 ft 7 in) on her first attempt in Kuortane. Heltelä bettered her record at the European Indoor Championships held in March in Istanbul, soaring clear at 4.80 m (15 ft 8 3/4 in) on her first attempt for the gold medal.

== Statistics ==
=== Personal bests ===
- Pole vault – 4.85 m (15 ft 10 3/4 in) (Munich 2022) NR
  - Pole vault indoor – 4.80 m (15 ft 8 3/4 in) (Istanbul 2023) NR
  - Pole vault indoor U20 – 4.71 m (15 ft 5 1/4 in) (Zweibrücken 2016) WU20R

=== International competitions ===
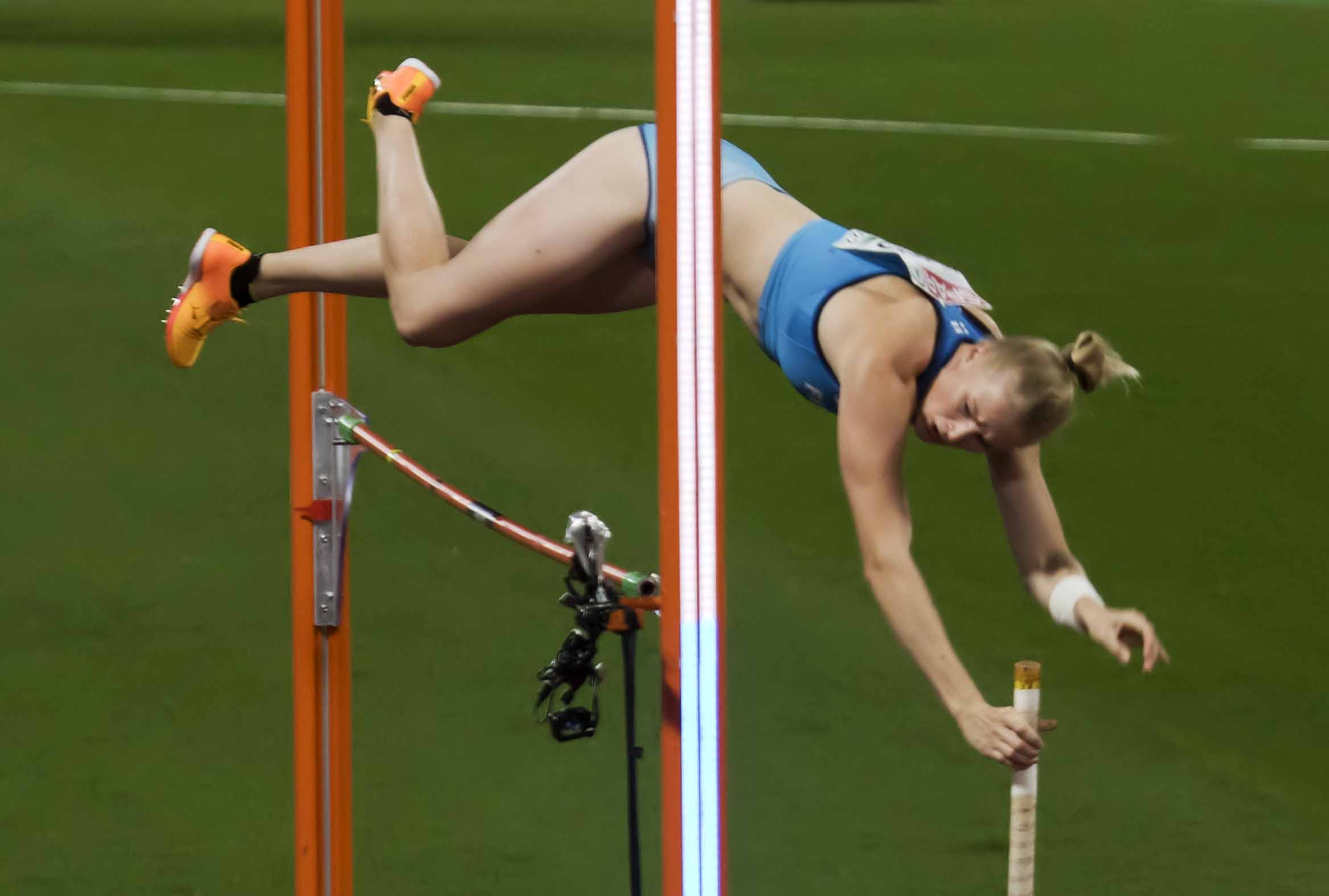
Wilma Heltelä at the women's pole vault final at the 2022 European Championships in Munich

Wilma Heltelä at the women's pole vault final at the European Athletics Championships in Munich on 17 August 2022.

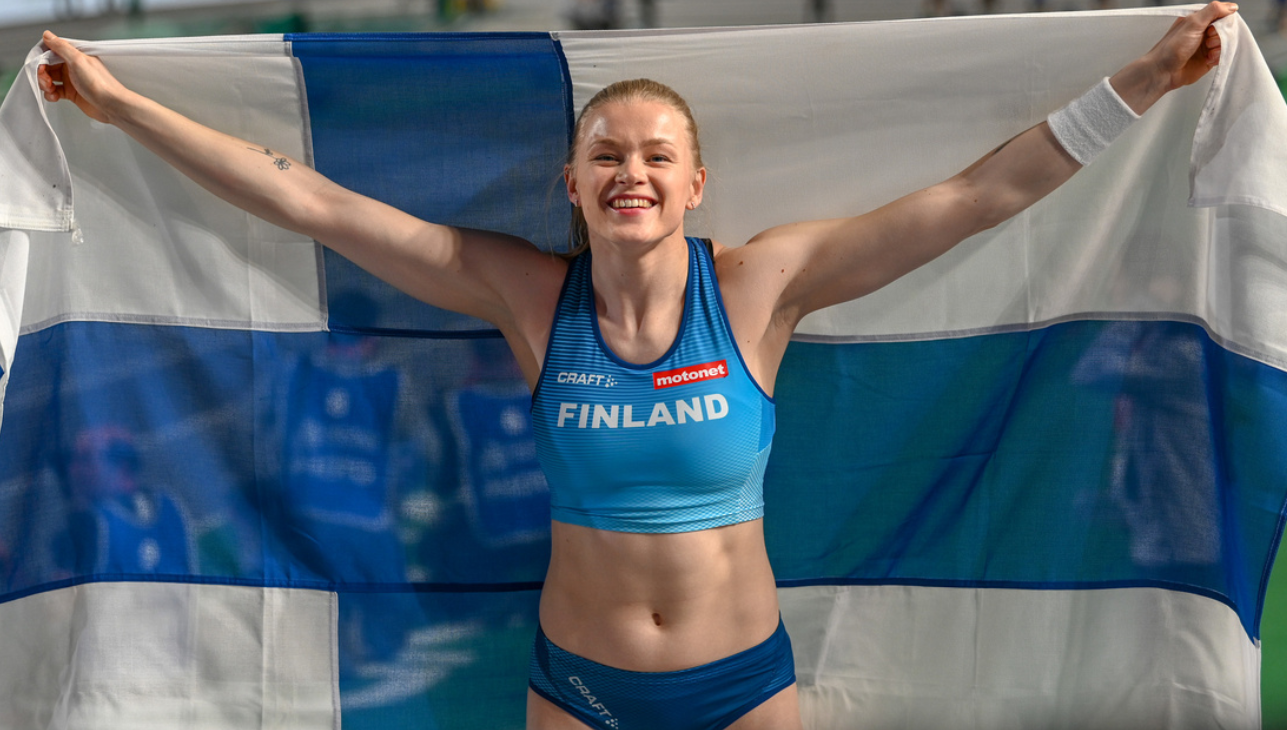
Heltelä at the 2023 European Indoor Championships in Istanbul

Representing Finland
Year	Competition	Venue	Position	Result
2014	World Junior Championships	Eugene, OR, United States	25th (q)	3.75 m
2015	European Indoor Championships	Prague, Czech Republic	–	DNS
2015	European Junior Championships	Eskilstuna, Sweden	–	NH
2016	European Championships	Amsterdam, Netherlands	7th	4.45 m
2016	World U20 Championships	Bydgoszcz, Poland	3rd	4.40 m
2016	Olympic Games	Rio de Janeiro, Brazil	24th (q)	4.30 m
2017	European Indoor Championships	Belgrade, Serbia	8th	4.40 m
2017	European U20 Championships	Grosseto, Italy	3rd	4.15 m
2018	European Championships	Berlin, Germany	17th (q)	4.35 m
2019	European Indoor Championships	Glasgow, United Kingdom	18th (q)	4.10 m
2019	European U23 Championships	Gävle, Sweden	5th	4.20 m
2019	European Team Championships Super League	Bydgoszcz, Poland	8th	4.21 m
2019	World Championships	Doha, Qatar	22nd (q)	4.35 m
2021	European Indoor Championships	Toruń, Poland	6th	4.55 m
2021	Olympic Games	Tokyo, Japan	5th	4.50 m
2022	World Championships	Eugene, OR, United States	6th	4.60 m
2022	European Championships	Munich, Germany	1st	4.85 m =CR NR
2023	European Indoor Championships	Istanbul, Turkey	1st	4.80 m NR
2023	World Championships	Budapest, Hungary	3rd	4.80 m
2024	World Indoor Championships	Glasgow, United Kingdom	9th	4.55 m
2024	European Championships	Rome, Italy	8th	4.43 m
2024	Olympic Games	Paris, France	6th	4.70 m
2025	World Championships	Tokyo, Japan	–	NM
2026	World Indoor Championships	Toruń, Poland	11th	4.55 m
2026	European Championships	Birmingham, United Kingdom	2nd	4.75 m

=== National titles ===
- Finland-Sweden Athletics International
  - Pole vault: 2023, 2026
- Finnish Athletics Championships
  - Pole vault: 2018, 2019, 2020, 2021
- Finnish Indoor Athletics Championships
  - Pole vault: 2019, 2020
