= Ryan Shields (sprinter) =

Jamaican sprinter

Personal information
- Nationality: Jamaican
- Born: 12 May 1983 (age 43)
- Home town: Chicago, Illinois
- Height: 188 cm (6 ft 2 in)
- Weight: 82 kg (181 lb)

Sport
- Sport: Athletics
- Event(s): 100 metres, 60 metres
- College team: Wayland Baptist Pioneers
- Club: HAAG Atletiek

Achievements and titles
- Personal bests: 100m: • 9.89 w (+4.8) (2017); • 10.16 (+1.5) (2017); 60m: 6.56 (2017)
Medal record
Men's athletics
Representing Jamaica
European Champion Clubs Cup Group B
Bronze medal – third place	2016 Leiria	100 m
Bronze medal – third place	2016 Leiria	200 m
Silver medal – second place	2016 Leiria	4 × 100 m

Ryan Shields (born 12 May 1983) is a Jamaican former sprinter. He was described as "the most accomplished sprinter in IHSA history" and finished 3rd in the 2017 Stockholm Diamond League with a wind-aided 100 metres time of 9.89 seconds.

== Biography ==
Shields grew up in Chicago, Illinois, where he was a standout prep sprinter for Leo Catholic High School. He was the first ever to win Class A state titles in the 100 m, 200 m, and 400 m, which he did three years in a row.

Though his grade-point average was sufficient, Shields did not have the necessary ACT score to qualify for an NCAA Division I scholarship. Because of this, Shields competed for the Wayland Baptist Pioneers track and field team in college, an NAIA school. He set the NAIA national indoor record in the 200 m and won several NAIA national titles from 2003 to 2006.

After 2008, Shields was training under the HAAG Atletiek club in the Netherlands. He competed at the 2008 Jamaican Athletics Championship, where he did not qualify for the finals.

In 2016, Shields secured podium finishes in Group B at the European Champion Clubs Cup, finishing 3rd in the 100 m and 200 m, and 2nd in the 4 × 100 m. In 2017 at the Stockholm Diamond League, Shields clocked a wind-aided 9.89-second performance in the 100 metres, finishing 3rd behind Andre de Grasse and Ben Youssef Meite.

== Statistics ==
=== Personal bests ===
Event	Mark	Competition	Venue	Date
100 metres (wind assisted)	9.89 w (+4.8 m/s)	Stockholm Diamond League	Stockholm, Sweden	18 June 2017
100 metres (wind legal)	10.16 (+1.5 m/s)	IFAM Oordegem	Oordegem, Belgium	27 May 2017
60 metres	6.56	Orlen Cup 2017	Łódź, Poland	16 February 2017
