= 2019 European Athletics U23 Championships – Women's pole vault =

The women's pole vault event at the 2019 European Athletics U23 Championships was held in Gävle, Sweden, at Gavlehof Stadium Park on 12 and 14 July.

== Medalists ==
Gold	Silver	Bronze
Angelica Moser; Switzerland	Amálie Švábíková; Czech Republic	Yelizaveta Bondarenko; Authorised Neutral Athletes

== Results ==
=== Qualification ===
Qualification rule: 4.30 (Q) or the 12 best results (q) qualified for the final.

Rank	Group	Name	Nationality	3.60	3.75	3.90	4.05	4.15	4.25	Results	Notes
1	B	Angelica Moser	Switzerland	–	–	–	–	–	o	4.25	q
2	A	Miren Bartolomé	Spain	–	–	o	–	xo	o	4.25	q
3	A	Wilma Murto	Finland	–	–	–	–	xxo	o	4.25	q
4	B	Alice Moindrot	France	–	–	–	o	o	xo	4.25	q
5	B	Yelizaveta Bondarenko	Authorised Neutral Athletes	–	–	–	–	xo	xo	4.25	q
6	B	Amálie Švábíková	Czech Republic	–	–	–	o	xo	xxo	4.25	q
7	B	Killiana Heymans	Netherlands	–	–	–	–	o	xxx	4.15	q
8	A	Charlotte Iva	France	–	–	o	xo	o	xxx	4.15	q
9	B	Nikola Pöschlová	Czech Republic	–	o	o	o	xo	xxx	4.15	q, SB
10	A	Marijke Wijnmaalen	Netherlands	–	–	o	xxo	xo	xxx	4.15	q
11	A	Agnieszka Kaszuba	Poland	–	o	o	o	xxo	xxx	4.15	q
12	A	Pascale Stöcklin	Switzerland	–	–	–	xo	xxo	xxx	4.15	q
13	A	Laura Ollikainen	Finland	–	–	xo	xo	xxo	xxx	4.15	
14	A	Linnea Jönsson	Sweden	–	o	o	o	xxx		4.05	=PB
14	A	Alix Dehaynain	France	–	–	o	o	xxx		4.05	
16	A	Melanie Vissers	Belgium	–	xo	o	o	xxx		4.05	
16	A	Hanga Klekner	Hungary	–	o	xo	o	xxx		4.05	
18	B	Birgitte Kjuus	Norway	–	–	xxo	o	xxx		4.05	
19	B	Andrea San José	Spain	–	–	xo	xo	xxx		4.05	
20	A	Zuzana Pražáková	Czech Republic	–	o	o	xxx			3.90	
21	B	Henriikka Könönen	Finland	–	xo	o	xxx			3.90	
22	B	Yuliya Maksymenko	Ukraine	o	o	xo	xxx			3.90	
22	B	Ellen Olsson	Sweden	–	–	xo	xxx			3.90	
	B	Nastja Modic	Slovenia	–	xxx					NM	

=== Final ===
Rank	Name	Nationality	4.00	4.20	4.35	4.45	4.56	4.66	Result	Notes
1st place, gold medalist(s)	Angelica Moser	Switzerland	–	xo	o	o	o	xxx	4.56	EU23L, SB
2nd place, silver medalist(s)	Amálie Švábíková	Czech Republic	o	o	o	xxx			4.35	
3rd place, bronze medalist(s)	Yelizaveta Bondarenko	Authorised Neutral Athletes	–	xxo	xo	xxx			4.35	
4	Killiana Heymans	Netherlands	–	o	xxx				4.20	
5	Charlotte Iva	France	o	xo	xxx				4.20	=PB
5	Wilma Murto	Finland	–	xo	xxx				4.20	
7	Miren Bartolomé	Spain	o	xxx					4.00	
7	Alice Moindrot	France	o	xxx					4.00	
7	Nikola Pöschlová	Czech Republic	o	xxx					4.00	
10	Pascale Stöcklin	Switzerland	xo	xxx					4.00	
10	Marijke Wijnmaalen	Netherlands	xo	xxx					4.00	
	Agnieszka Kaszuba	Poland	xxx						NM	
