= John P. Fardy =

US Marine Corps Medal of Honor recipient

John Peter Fardy
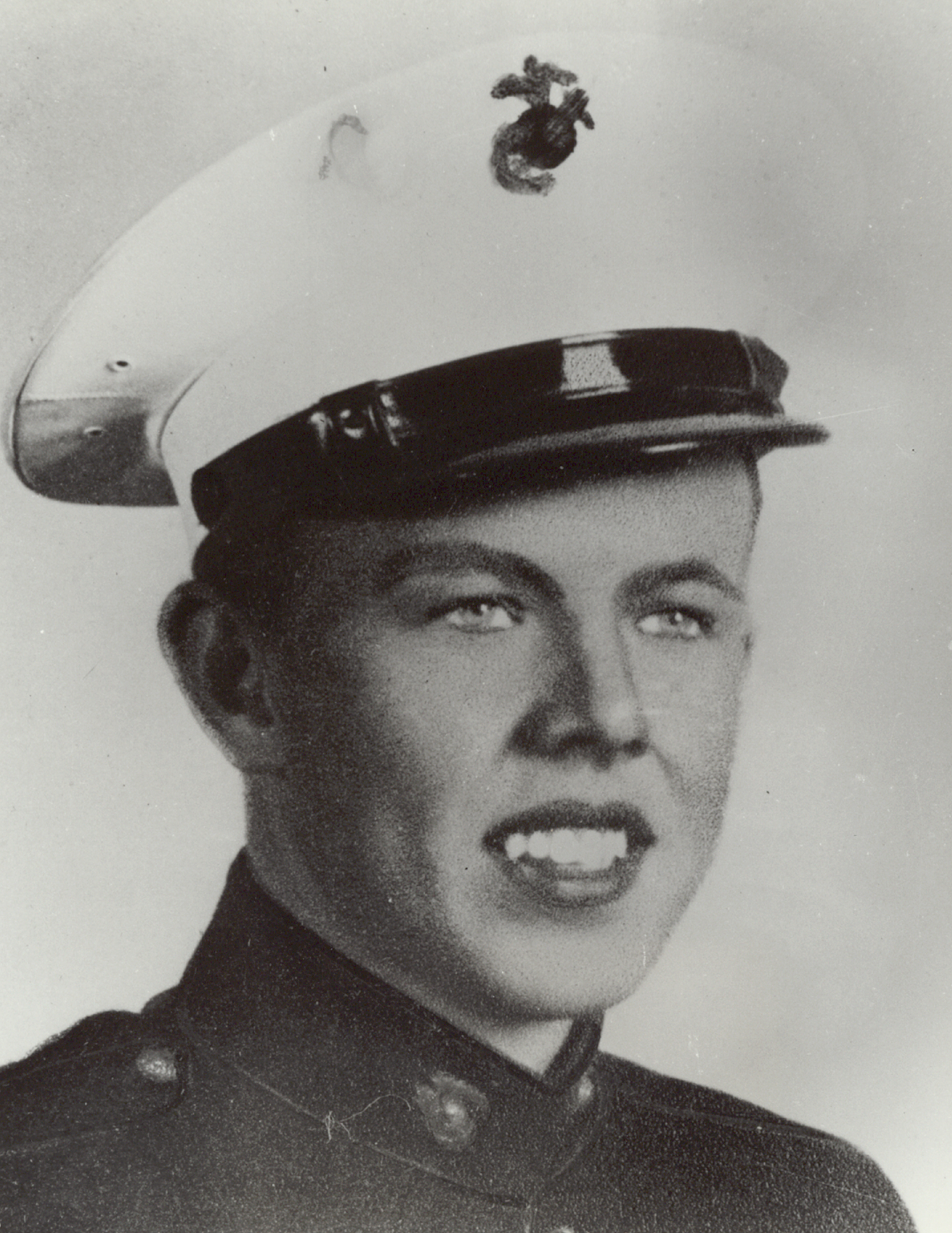
- Medal of Honor recipient
- Born: August 15, 1922; Chicago, Illinois, US
- Died: May 7, 1945 (aged 22); Okinawa, Japanese Empire
- Burial place: Holy Sepulchre Cemetery, Chicago, Illinois
- Military career
- Allegiance: United States
- Branch: United States Marine Corps
- Service years: 1943–1945
- Rank: Corporal
- Units: Company C, 1st Battalion, 1st Marines, 1st Marine Division
- Conflicts: World War II; *Battle of Cape Gloucester; *Battle of Peleliu; *Battle of Okinawa †
- Awards: Medal of Honor; Purple Heart

John Peter Fardy (August 15, 1922 – May 7, 1945) was a United States Marine who was killed in action during World War II. On May 6, 1945, during the Battle of Okinawa, Fardy dove onto an enemy hand grenade and smothered the blast with his body to save several nearby Marines, but died of his wounds the next day. His heroic actions were later recognized with the Medal of Honor, the United States' highest military decoration.

== Early years ==
John Peter Fardy was born in Chicago, Illinois, on August 15, 1922. His parents were Irish immigrants: Martin J. Fardy, a fireman from County Wexford, and Mary E. (née Kilkenny) Fardy from County Roscommon. He also had two older sisters Mary and Anne. He grew up in the Chatham neighborhood on the South Side of Chicago. Educated in the schools of Chicago, he graduated from Leo Catholic High School in 1940. He took a course in typing at the Fox Secretarial College the same year, and entered the Illinois Institute of Technology the following year. He majored in mechanical engineering, but left after the first year. He had been doing time study work previously, and took a job at the Cornell Forge Company as a time study man and draftsman.

== Marine Corps career ==
Inducted into the Marine Corps on May 8, 1943, Fardy went through recruit training at Marine Corps Recruit Depot San Diego, California, upon completion of which he was assigned to the Japanese Language School at Camp Elliott at his own request. He was promoted to private first class in July, about two weeks before the start of his school term. After one month of attendance at the language school, San Diego, Pfc. Fardy was transferred to an infantry unit where he was trained as an automatic rifleman.

Pfc. Fardy joined the 29th Replacement Battalion shortly before the unit left the United States on October 28, 1943. He journeyed to Nouméa, New Caledonia, and was reassigned to the 27th Replacement Battalion, which was leaving to join the 1st Marine Division.

Attached to Company C, 1st Battalion, 1st Marines upon his arrival at Goodenough Island, D'Entrecasteaux Islands, early in December 1943, Pfc. Fardy left with that unit about a week later for Nascing, Alatu, New Guinea. The stay there was a short one also, for the 1st Marines left Finschhafen on Christmas Day 1943, for their December 26 landing on enemy-held Cape Gloucester, New Britain. Within two months of the time he left his home shores, the former draftsman was involved in a battle for an enemy airdrome on an island rarely heard of before.

Following the Cape Gloucester operation, and the return of the 1st Marine Division to the Russell Islands for over three months of training, the division left for Peleliu. After practice landings at Guadalcanal, the division landed on the coral-studded, shadeless Peleliu. Pfc. Fardy participated in the capture of the airport and the attack on the coral hills overlooking it before returning to the Russell Islands with his regiment in early October.

Promoted to corporal on December 21, 1944, the veteran of two campaigns became a squad leader as the reorganized division started training for the next operation. The training ashore ended in February, and the Marines embarked aboard the ships that took them for practice landings at Baniki (Russell Islands), Guadalcanal, and Ulithi Atoll in the Caroline Islands. The landing on Okinawa occurred on Easter Sunday, April 1, 1945, and the division's sweep across the island up to the northern tip was accomplished with comparative ease. Later, Marines were moved south to help hard-pressed Army troops.

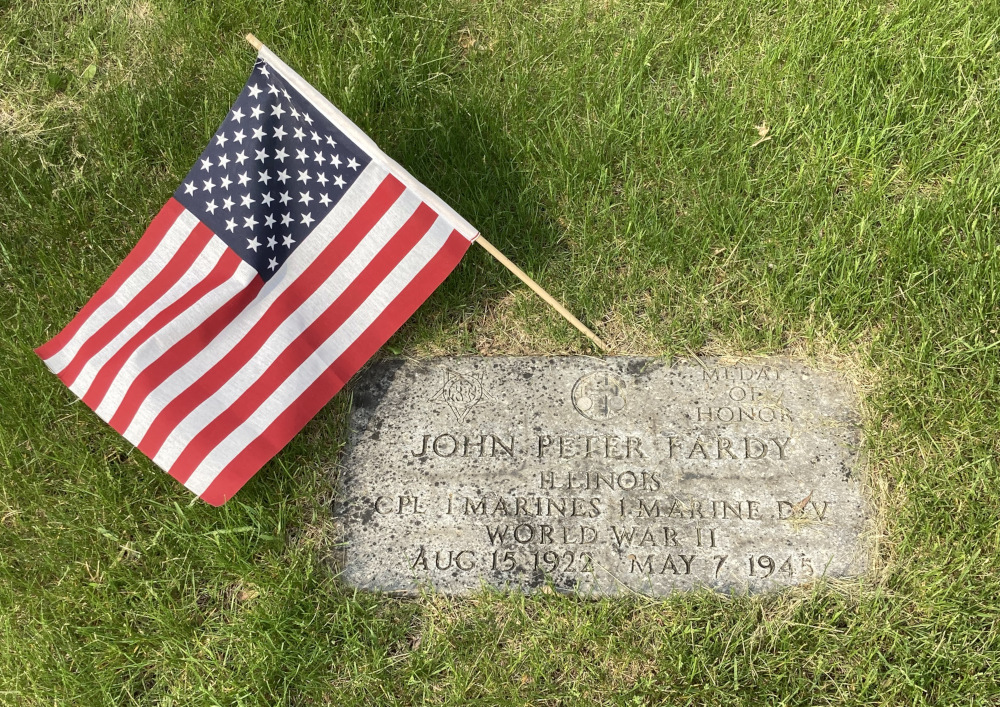
Fardy's grave at Holy Sepulchre Cemetery

It was on May 6, 1945, when Company C was advancing against a strongly fortified, fanatically defended Japanese position that Cpl. Fardy's squad was suddenly brought under heavy small-arms fire. Cpl. Fardy temporarily deployed his men along a convenient drainage ditch. Shortly afterwards, an enemy hand grenade landed in the ditch, falling among the pinned-down Marines. Instantly, the 22-year-old corporal flung himself upon the grenade and absorbed the exploding charge with his own body. Taken to a field hospital, Cpl. Fardy died the next day.

The Medal of Honor was presented to Cpl. Fardy's parents at ceremonies conducted by the Marine Corps League in Chicago, September 15, 1946.

Reinterment services for Cpl. Fardy, with military honors by the Chicago Detachment of the Marine Corps League, were held on April 7, 1949, at Holy Sepulchre Cemetery.

Cpl. Fardy's gravestone did not bear a designation detailing his Medal of Honor. This was discovered by military historian Dr. Terence Barrett of North Dakota State University during his study of Medal of Honor recipients. After an effort by local veterans and Leo High School alumni, his grave was rededicated with a Medal of Honor inscription at Holy Sepulchre Cemetery on August 8, 2011, with military honors by the 2nd Battalion, 24th Marines, the Military Order of the Purple Heart, and the Chicago Police Marine Corps League.

On November 3, 2023, Leo High School, Cpl. Fardy's alma mater, rededicated its Leo Veterans Memorial Courtyard as the "John P. Fardy Memorial Courtyard", placing there a stone memorial and plaque in his honor.

== Medal of Honor citation ==
The President of the United States takes pride in presenting the MEDAL OF HONOR posthumously to

CORPORAL JOHN P. FARDY
UNITED STATES MARINE CORPS

for service as set forth in the following CITATION:

For conspicuous gallantry and intrepidity at the risk of his life above and beyond the call of duty as a Squad Leader, serving with Company C, First Battalion, First Marines, First Marine Division, in action against enemy Japanese forces on Okinawa Shima in the Ryukyu Islands, 7 May 1945. When his squad was suddenly assailed by extremely heavy small-arms fire from the front during a determined advance against strongly fortified, fiercely defended Japanese positions, Corporal Fardy temporarily deployed his men along a near-by drainage ditch. Shortly thereafter, an enemy grenade fell among the Marines in the ditch. Instantly throwing himself upon the deadly missile, Corporal Fardy absorbed the exploding blast in his own body, thereby protecting his comrades from certain and perhaps fatal injuries. Concerned solely for the welfare of his men, he willingly relinquished his own hope of survival that his fellow Marines might live to carry on the fight against a fanatic enemy. A stouthearted leader and indomitable fighter, Corporal Fardy, by his prompt decision and resolute spirit of self-sacrifice in the face of certain death, had rendered valiant service, and his conduct throughout reflects the highest credit upon himself and the United States Naval Service. He gallantly gave his life for his country.

/S/ HARRY S. TRUMAN

== Awards and decorations ==

1st row	Medal of Honor	Purple Heart	Combat Action Ribbon
2nd Row	American Campaign Medal	Asiatic-Pacific Campaign Medal with one campaign star	World War II Victory Medal

== See also ==
- List of Medal of Honor recipients
- List of Medal of Honor recipients for World War II
