= 2016 European Champion Clubs Cup =

- Host city: Mersin, Turkey (Group A); Leiria, Portugal (Group B)
- Dates: 27-28 May 2016

The 2016 European Champion Clubs Cup (ECCC) in athletics was held in Mersin, Turkey and Leiria, Portugal, from 27 to 28 May.

== Results ==
Winning clubs

Games	Gold		Silver		Bronze	
Men's First Division (Group A)	Enka SK (Turkey)	82 pts	CA Playas de Castellón (ESP)	74 pts	S.L. Benfica (Portugal)	64 pts
Women's First Division (Group A)	Sporting Clube de Portugal (Portugal)	133 pts	CA Valencia Terra i Mar (ESP)	122 pts	Fenerbahçe Athletics (Turkey)	116 pts

=== First Division (Group A) ===
Men

Event	First		Second		Third	
100m	Jak Ali Harvey (TUR)	10.26	Bruno Hortelano (ESP)	10.32	Bruno de Barros (BRA)	10.51
200m	Jak Ali Harvey (TUR)	21.05	Bruno de Barros (BRA)	21.12	Arian Olmos Tellez (ESP)	21.73
400m	Batuhan Altıntaş (TUR)	47.44	Lluis Vallejo (ESP)	48.04	Rokas Pacevičius (LTU)	48.19
800m	Antoine Gakeme (BDI)	1:50.39	Emanuel Rolim (POR)	1:51.39	Nick Jensen (DEN)	1:51.64
1500m	Antoine Gakeme (BDI)	3:40.36	Hélio Gomes (POR)	3:41.85	Süleyman Bekmezci (TUR)	3:45.09
3000m	Ali Kaya (TUR)	7:50.66	Hélio Gomes (POR)	7:56.62	Víctor José Corrales (ESP)	8:13.19
5000m	Jaouad Tougane (MAR)	13:26.17	Polat Kemboi Arıkan (TUR)	13:40.97	Rui Pinto (POR)	14:24.85
3000m Steeplechase	Tarik Langat Akdag (TUR)	8:34.64	Ole Hesselbjerg (DEN)	8:37.27	Luís Miguel Borges (POR)	8:55.55
110m Hurdles	Yidiel Contreras (ESP)	13.99	Rapolas Saulius (LTU)	14.14	Mustafa Güneş (TUR)	14.27
400m Hurdles	Abdelmalik Lahoulou (ALG)	50.41	Nicolai Trock Hartling (DEN)	51.35	André Sá (POR)	54.77
High Jump	Miguel Ángel Sancho (ESP)	2.24	Paulo Conceição (POR)	2.22	Raivydas Stanys (LTU)	2.19
Pole Vault	Diogo Ferreira (POR)	5.55	Nikita Filippov (KAZ)	5.45	Igor Bychkov (ESP)	5.40
Long Jump	Muammer Demir (TUR)	7.52	Tomas Vitonis (LTU)	7.52	Fernando Ramos (ESP)	7.51
Triple Jump	Pablo Torrijos (ESP)	16.37	Nelson Évora (POR)	16.26	Şeref Osmanoğlu (TUR)	16.13
Shot Put	Tsanko Arnaudov (POR)	20.04	Šarūnas Banevičius (LTU)	18.47	Hüseyin Atıcı (TUR)	18.37
Discus Throw	Lois Maikel Martínez (ESP)	60.53	Ercüment Olgundeniz (TUR)	60.51	Aleksas Abromavičius (LTU)	57.82
Hammer throw	Eşref Apak (TUR)	72.70	Javier Cienfuegos (ESP)	70.94	António Vital e Silva (POR)	65.33
Javelin throw	Edis Matusevičius (LTU)	81.28	Emin Öncel (TUR)	76.02	Pablo Bugallo (ESP)	66.13
4 x 100m	ENKA SPORTS CLUB (TUR); Volkan Çakan; İzzet Safer; Emre Zafer Barnes; Jak Ali Harvey	39.51	Sport Lisboa e Benfica (POR); Diogo Antunes; Bruno de Barros; Arnaldo Abrantes; Andre Costa	40.22	PLAYAS CASTELLON (ESP); Arian Olmos Tellez; Bruno Hortelano; Alberto Gavaldá; Daniel Rodríguez	40.53
4 x 400m	ENKA SPORTS CLUB (TUR); Mehmet Güzel; İzzet Safer; Abdelmalik Lahoulou; Batuhan Altıntaş	3:09.55	PLAYAS CASTELLON (ESP); Alberto Gavaldá; David Jiménez; Víctor José Corrales; Lluis Vallejo	3:09.65	Sport Lisboa e Benfica (POR); Andre Marques; Diogo Pinhão; Ricardo Dos Santos; Andre Costa	3:12.42

Women

Event	First		Second		Third	
100m	Lorène Dorcas Bazolo (POR)	11.70	Lina Grinčikaitė Samuolė (LTU)	11.83	Milana Tirnanić (SRB)	11.97
200m	Estela García (ESP)	23.75	Lorène Dorcas Bazolo (POR)	23.81	Lina Grinčikaitė Samuolė (LTU)	24.18
400m	Tamara Salaški (SRB)	52.48	Cátia Azevedo (POR)	52.96	Olha Lyakhova (UKR)	53.45
800m	Olha Lyakhova (UKR)	2:09.03	Kateřina Hálová (CZE)	2:09.44	Solange Andreia Pereira (ESP)	2:09.46
1500m	Solange Andreia Pereira (ESP)	4:18.26	Sviatlana Kudzelich (BLR)	4:20.58	Elif Karabulut (TUR)	4:22.35
3000m	Sara Moreira (POR)	9:07.93	Büşra Nur Koku (TUR)	9:21.57	Diana Lobacevske (LTU)	9:27.94
5000m	Jessica Augusto (POR)	15:52.53	Diana Lobacevske (LTU)	16:02.78	Büşra Nur Koku (TUR)	16:11.64
3000m Steeplechase	Sviatlana Kudzelich (BLR)	9:43.05	Diana Martín (ESP)	9:52.91	Elif Karabulut (TUR)	9:57.40
100m Hurdles	Karolina Kołeczek (POL)	13.17	Nevin Yanıt (TUR)	13.65	Adja N'Diaye (SEN)	13.79
400m Hurdles	Vera Barbosa (POR)	57.48	Kateřina Hálová (CZE)	58.56	Laura Sotomayor (ESP)	59.66
High Jump	Airinė Palšytė (LTU)	1.90	Marija Vuković (MNE)	1.81	Raquel Álvarez (ESP)	1.81
Pole Vault	Marta Onofre (POR)	4.30	Demet Parlak (TUR)	4.30	Anna María Pinero (ESP)	4.10
Long Jump	Jana Velďáková (SVK)	6.44	María del Mar Jover (ESP)	6.28	Shaina Anthony Mags (POR)	6.03
Triple Jump	Patrícia Mamona (POR)	14.07	Dana Velďáková (SVK)	14.05	Diana Zagainova (LTU)	12.97
Shot Put	Aliona Dubitskaya (BLR)	17.67	Úrsula Ruiz (ESP)	16.59	Trine Mulbjerg (DEN)	15.90
Discus Throw	Irina Rodrigues (POR)	59.81	Zinaida Sendriūtė (LTU)	57.87	Dragana Tomašević (SRB)	55.99
Hammer throw	Tuğçe Şahutoğlu (TUR)	68.75	Berta Castells (ESP)	68.27	Celina Julin (DEN)	62.51
Javelin throw	Liveta Jasiūnaitė (LTU)	58.49	Eda Tuğsuz (TUR)	57.40	Mercedes Chilla (ESP)	50.87
4 x 100m	Valencia Terra i Mar (ESP); Karolina Kołeczek; Estela García; Cristina Castellar; Maria Isabel Pérez	45.30	Cosma Vilnius (LTU); Karīna Lipeckaja; Eva Misiūnaitė; Sonata Tamošaitytė; Lina Grinčikaitė Samuolė	45.67	Sporting Clube de Portugal (POR); Adja N'Diaye; Lorène Dorcas Bazolo; Carla Tavares; Olimpia Barbosa	45.95
4 x 400m	Sporting Clube de Portugal (POR); Miriam Tavares; Vera Barbosa; Filipa Martins; Cátia Azevedo	3:36.43	Fenerbahce Sport Club (TUR); Derya Yıldırım; Olha Lyakhova; Emel Şanlı-Kircin; Meryem Kasap	3:39.16	Valencia Terra i Mar (ESP); Laura Sotomayor; Indira Terrero; Modesta Morauskaitė; Estela García	3:42.70

=== Second Division (Group B) ===
Men

Event	First		Second		Third	
100m	Ján Volko (SVK)	10.42	Leon Reid (GBR)	10.51	Ryan Shields (JAM)	10.59
200m	Ján Volko (SVK)	20.69	Leon Reid (GBR)	20.83	Ryan Shields (JAM)	21.11
400m	Sadam Koumi (SUD)	45.98	Denis Danac (SVK)	47.35	Jernej Jeras (SLO)	47.72
800m	Žan Rudolf (SLO)	1:51.62	Jaakko Laakso (FIN)	1:51.73	Elliot Giles (GBR)	1:52.13
1500m	Pierre Antoine Balhan (BEL)	3:50.01	Jan Petrač (SLO)	3:50.34	Sindre Løchting (NOR)	3:50.45
3000m	Erik Udø Pedersen (NOR)	8:21.89	Jaakko Piesanen (FIN)	8:28.92	Simon Petitjean (BEL)	8:38.65
5000m	Okubamichael Fissehatsion (ERI)	14:24.06	Jarkko Järvenpää (FIN)	14:24.07	Emmanuel Lejeune (BEL)	14:32.96
3000m Steeplechase	David Flynn (IRL)	8:55.13	Blaž Grad (SLO)	8:56.03	Thomas Jefferson Byrkjeland (NOR)	8:57.51
110m Hurdles	Damien Broothaerts (BEL)	13.96	Denis Hanjoul (BEL)	14.12	Edirin Okoro (GBR)	14.63
400m Hurdles	Arnaud Ghislain (BEL)	50.28	Paul Byrne (IRL)	51.68	Jacques Frisch (LUX)	52.28
High Jump	Mike Edwards (GBR)	2.15	Jussi Viita (FIN)	2.12	Fabiano Kalandula (BEL)	2.02
Pole Vault	Urho Kujanpää (FIN)	5.05	Jack Phipps (GBR)	4.95	Ján Zmoray (SVK)	4.85
Long Jump	Corentin Campener (BEL)	7.63	Keith Marks (IRL)	7.48	Fabian Florant (NED)	7.45
Triple Jump	Fabian Florant (NED)	16.35	Jan Luxa (SLO)	15.03	Vetle Utsi Onstad (NOR)	14.97
Shot Put	Marcus Thomsen (NOR)	17.46	Mathijs Damsteegt (NED)	17.26	Blaž Zupančič (SLO)	17.02
Discus Throw	Michal Holica (SVK)	54.22	Najee Fox (GBR)	50.51	Sven Forster (LUX)	50.35
Hammer throw	Eivind Prestegård Henriksen (NOR)	72.07	Chris Shorthouse (GBR)	68.66	Joni Syrjälä (FIN)	59.58
Javelin throw	Matija Kranjc (SLO)	80.01	Joni Karvinen (FIN)	70.99	Gregg Miller (GBR)	64.72
4 x 100m	AD Mass Ljubljana (SLO); Enej Vrhunec; Alen Nuhanovič; Luka Rakic; Jan Žumer	41.30	Haag Atletik (NED); Naresh Kuwas; Fabian Florant; Sander Pupella; Ryan Shields	41.50	Birchfield Harriers (GBR); Jake Porter; Efekemo Okoro; Leon Reid; Andrew Cousins	41.77
4 x 400m	Birchfield Harriers (GBR); Christian Bryan; Efekemo Okoro; Elliott Rutter; Sadam Koumi	3:09.80	Royal Excelsior SC Brussels (BEL); Antoine Gillet; Sébastien Lins; Asamti Badji; Arnaud Ghislain	3:11.61	AD Mass Ljubljana (SLO); Jernej Jeras; Lovrenc Valič; Jan Petrač; Žan Rudolf	3:11.82

Women

Event	First		Second		Third	
100m	Clieo Stephenson (GBR)	11.86	Yiff'at Zelikovitz (ISR)	12.18	Kaja Debevec (SLO)	12.27
200m	Diana Vaisman (ISR)	24.63	Aneja Kodrič (SLO)	24.96	Mollie O'Reilly (IRL)	24.98
400m	Montené Speight (GBR)	53.26	Sinead Denny (IRL)	53.63	Anita Horvat (SLO)	54.45
800m	Aino Paunonen (FIN)	2:14.10	Michaela Mayor (GBR)	2:14.71	Sophie Murphy (IRL)	2:16.04
1500m	Maria McCambridge (IRL)	4:31.86	Amanda Virtanen (FIN)	4:48.50	Anja Robavs (SLO)	4:51.51
3000m	Patricija Plazar (SLO)	10:01.23	Meghan Ryan (IRL)	10:07.62	Fiona Thompson (GBR)	10:10.45
5000m	Fiona Clinton (IRL)	17:12.20	Tracy Barlow (GBR)	17:27.17	Anna Vuorimaa (FIN)	18:07.35
3000m Steeplechase	Laura Shaughnessy (IRL)	11:13.02	Hanna Uski (FIN)	11:41.27	Lisa Da Silva (GBR)	11:52.21
100m Hurdles	Angie Broadbelt-Blake (GBR)	14.22	Laura Strajnar (SLO)	14.84	Noa Levi (ISR)	15.03
400m Hurdles	Venla Paunonen (FIN)	58.39	Lucy Ferguson (GBR)	1:01.63	Brina Mljač (SLO)	1:03.22
High Jump	Grace O'Rourke (IRL)	1.70	Tina Kralj (SLO)	1.60	Noy Lifshitz (ISR)	1.60
Pole Vault	Tina Šutej (SLO)	3.50	Olga Bronstein (ISR)	3.35	Shannon Connolly (GBR)	3.35
Long Jump	Yiff'at Zelikovitz (ISR)	5.85	Snežana Vukmirovič (SLO)	5.80	Lia Stephenson (GBR)	5.56
Triple Jump	Snežana Vukmirovič (SLO)	13.00	Angela Barrett (GBR)	12.94	Paz Peretz (ISR)	11.10
Shot Put	Danielle Opara (GBR)	13.64	Inbal Cohen (ISR)	12.10	Julia Bremser (GER)	11.95
Discus Throw	Julia Bremser (GER)	53.94	Elina Mattila (FIN)	49.77	Inbal Cohen (ISR)	39.75
Hammer throw	Emma O'Hara (IRL)	57.26	Yevgeniya Zabolotniy (ISR)	52.56	Sanne Erkkola (FIN)	33.23
Javelin throw	Anita Fitzgibbon (IRL)	49.79	Sanne Erkkola (FIN)	44.46	Tina Vaupot (SLO)	44.11
4 x 100m	Thames Valley Harriers (GBR); Tayla Brade; Angie Broadbelt-Blake; Montené Speight; Clieo Stephenson	47.30	AD MASS Ljubljana (SLO); Tea Podbevšek; Laura Strajnar; Aneja Kodrič; Kaja Debevec	47.41	Maccabi Reshon Lezion (ISR); Noa Levi; Noah Maor; Diana Vaisman; Yiff'at Zelikovitz	47.69
4 x 400m	Thames Valley Harriers (GBR); Angela Barrett; Zoey Clark; Montené Speight; Jess Tappin	3:42.17	Dundrum South Dublin (IRL); Katie Magee; Mollie O'Reilly; Rachel Dunne; Sinead Denny	3:50.36	AD MASS Ljubljana (SLO); Ajda Lenardič; Brina Mljač; Eva Kavka; Anita Horvat	3:54.58
