= Demet Parlak =

Turkish pole vaulter (born 1990)

Personal information
- Nationality: TUR
- Born: 1 January 1990 (age 36) Pınarlı, Çamoluk, Giresun, Turkey

Sport
- Sport: Athletics
- Event: Pole vault
- Club: Fenerbahçe Athletics
Medal record
Women's athletics
Representing Turkey
Islamic Solidarity Games
Gold medal – first place	2025 Riyadh	Pole vault
Gold medal – first place	2021 Konya	Pole vault
Gold medal – first place	2017 Baku	Pole vault
Balkan Championships
Silver medal – second place	2025 Volos	Pole vaılt
Bronze medal – third place	2020 Cluj-Napoca	Pole vaılt
Silver medal – second place	2016 Pitești	Pole vaılt
Balkan Indoor Championships
Bronze medal – third place	2024 Istanbul	Pole vault
Bronze medal – third place	2022 Istanbul	Pole vault
Gold medal – first place	2016 Istanbul	Pole vault
Silver medal – second place	2014 Istanbul	Pole vault
European Champion Clubs Cup
Silver medal – second place	2016 Mersin	Pole vault NR

Demet Parlak (born 1 January 1990) is a Turkish pole vaulter.

== Early years ==
Inspired by the 2008 Beijing Olympics, she watched in the television, Parlak decided to start performing athletics. In 2010, she began training. However, her parents opposed t her sport activity in athletics with the argument that she would neglect her education. Continuing in athletics, she told her family that she had quit athletics, but was selected to the school's basketball team. After being successful in her age category and also in the senior category, as well as breaking records, her parents changed their mind and agreed to her sport in athletics. With the support of her parents, she entered Olympics Preparation Center of Adana, where she was coached by the Ukrainian Oleksondr Smakin and Turkish İbrahim Halil Aydın.

== Sport career ==
Parlak is a member of Fenerbahçe Athletics.

In 2015, she set a new national indoor U23 and senior women record with 4.25 m at the Istanbul Championships.

She won her country's first gold medal in the pole vault event at the 2016 Balkan Indoor Championships in Istanbul, Turkey. The same year at the |2016 European Champion Clubs Cup in Mersin, Turkey, she won the silver medal, and set a new Turkish record with 4.30 m in the women's U23 and seniors category. She also took the silver medal at the Balkan Championships in Pitești, Romania.

She won the gold medal at the 2017 Islamic Solidarity Games in Baku, Azerbaijan.

She took the bronze medal at the 2020 Balkan Championships in Cluj-Napoca, Romania.

In 2022, at the postponed 2021 Islamic Solidarity Games in Konya, Turkey, she became gold medalist.

She took the silver medal at the 2025 Balkan Championships in Volos, Greece. She competed at the Athletics at the 2025 Islamic Solidarity Games in Riyadh, Saudi Arabia, and won the gold medal.

== Personal life ==
Demet Parlak was born in Pınarlı village of Çamoluk District in Giresun Province as the second child of three to Cemil Parlak, on 1 January 1990. She moved to Adana with her family due to her father's profession.

== International competition ==
Year	Competition	Venue	Position	Result	Notes
Representing Turkey
2013	World Youth Championships	Donetsk, Uktaine	15th Q	3.75 m	
2014	Balkan Indoor Championships	Istanbul, Turkey	2nd	3.90 m	
2014	Mediterranean U23 Championships	Aubagne, France	4th	3.86 m	
2014	European Team Championships Super League	Braunschweig, Germany	10th	360 m	
2014	World Junior Championships	Eugene, Oregon, USA	11th	3.90 m	
2016	Balkan Indoor Championships	Istanbul, Turkey	1st	4.20 m	
2016	European Champion Clubs Cup	Mersin, Turkey	2nd	4.30 m NR	
2016	Balkan Championships	Pitești, Romania	2nd	3.80 m	
2017	Islamic Solidarity Games	Baku, Azerbaijan	1st	4.15 m	
2017	European U23 Championships	Bydgoszcz, Poland	12th	4.00 m	
2018	Mediterranean Games	Tarragona, Spain	9th	4.01 m	
2020	Balkan Championships	Cluj-Napoca, Romania	3rd	4.10 m	
2022	Balkan Indoor Championships	Istanbul, Turkey	3rd	4.20 m	
2022	Islamic Solidarity Games	Konya, Turkey	1st	4.00 m	
2024	Balkan Indoor Championships	Istanbul, Turkey	3rd	4.20 m	
2025	European Team Championships Second Division	Maribor, Slovenia June	6th	4.00 m	
2025	Balkan Championships	Volos, Greece	2nd	4.15 m	
2025	Islamic Solidarity Games	Riyadh, Saudi Arabia	1st	4.06 m	
