= Killiana Heymans =

Dutch pole vaulter

Personal information
- Born: 24 January 1997 (age 29)

Sport
- Sport: Athletics
- Event: Pole vault
- Club: PAC
- Coached by: Jaap van der Plaat

Killiana Heymans (born 24 January 1997) is a Dutch athlete specialising in the pole vault. She represented her country at the 2019 World Championships in Doha without qualifying for the final. In addition, she finished fourth at the 2019 European U23 Championships.

Heymans' personal bests in the event are 4.51 metres outdoors (Cologne 2019) and 4.46 metres indoors (Sandnes 2019).

== International competitions ==
Year	Competition	Venue	Position	Notes
Representing the Netherlands
2015	European Junior Championships	Eskilstuna, Sweden	16th (q)	3.85 m
2016	World U20 Championships	Bydgoszcz, Poland	17th (q)	3.95 m
2017	European U23 Championships	Bydgoszcz, Poland	9th	4.20 m
2019	European U23 Championships	Gävle, Sweden	4th	4.20 m
2019	World Championships	Doha, Qatar	31st (q)	4.20 m
