= Leo Catholic High School =

All-male school in Chicago, Illinois, US

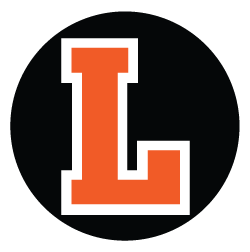

Location
- 7901 South Sangamon Street; Auburn Gresham, Chicago, Illinois 60620; United States; 41°45′1″N 87°38′50″W

Information
- Type: private all-male, secondary parochial
- Motto: Facta Non Verba (Deeds Not Words)
- Religious affiliation: Roman Catholic
- Patron saint: Pope Leo XIII
- Established: 1926
- Founder: Peter F. Shewbridge
- Oversight: Archdiocese of Chicago
- President: Daniel McGrath
- Principal: Shaka Rawls
- Faculty: 19
- Grades: 9–12
- Enrollment: 174 (2019-2020)
- Campus type: urban
- Colors: Orange; Black
- Athletics conference: Chicago Catholic League
- Mascot: Leo the Lion
- Team name: Lions
- Accreditation: North Central Association of Colleges and Schools
- Newspaper: The Oriole
- Yearbook: Lion
- Tuition: US$9,300
- Website: www.leohighschool.org

Leo Catholic High School is a private all-male, Catholic high school in the Auburn-Gresham neighborhood of Chicago, Illinois, United States. It is located in the Archdiocese of Chicago. The school is named in honor of Pope Leo XIII.

== History ==
Established in 1926 by the Congregation of Christian Brothers, their first school in Chicago, Leo Catholic High School has educated thousands of boys from Chicago's South Side and suburbs.

== Athletics ==
Since its founding in 1926, Leo has competed in the Chicago Catholic League. The school also competes in state championship tournaments sponsored by the Illinois High School Association (IHSA).

These teams have finished in the top four of their respective IHSA state tournament:

- basketball: 4th place (1997–98); State Champions (2003–04); 2nd place (2015–16)
- track & field: 3rd place (1982–83, 2000–01, 2004–05); 2nd place (1999–2000, 2003–04); State Champions (1980–81, 1994–95, 1997–98, 2001–02, 2002–03, 2010–11, 2011–12)

The school was initially known for its football team, which made 8 appearances in Chicago's Prep Bowl, which pitted the champion of the Catholic League against the winner from the Chicago Public League from 1934 to 1956. The 1941, 42 and 56 teams won Prep Bowl city championships at Soldier Field. Leo High School is also recognized as the 1941 high school football national champion.

In particular, the 1937 and 1941 Prep Bowls are recognized as holding the state of Illinois' all-time records for attendance at a football game. The 1937 attendance was estimated at 110,000 spectators, which saw Leo lose to Austin High School, 26–0. The 1941 game saw 95,000 spectators watch Leo defeat Tilden High School, 46–13. The 1940 and 42 games each had 75,000 fans, meaning Leo has played in front of four of the 11 largest crowds in Illinois high school history.

== Heads of School ==
Principal

1. Shaka Rawls '93 (2016–present)

Presidents

1. Robert W. Foster (1991–2010)
2. Dan McGrath '68 (2010–present)

== Notable alumni ==
- John Boles (class of 1966), Major League Baseball manager and executive
- Andre Brown (class of 2000), NBA forward (2006–2009)
- Terrance A. Duffy (class of 1976),chairman and chief executive of the CME Group
- Thomas R. Fitzgerald (class of 1959), retired chief justice of the Illinois Supreme Court
- John P. Fardy (class of 1940), U.S. Marine who received the Medal of Honor posthumously for heroic actions at the Battle of Okinawa.
- John R. Gorman, auxiliary bishop of Chicago
- John J. Houlihan. Illinois state representatives and businessman
- Jason Jefferson (class of 1998), NFL defensive lineman (2005–08)
- Edward Maloney, politician
- Andrew J. McKenna (class of 1947), businessman (chairman of McDonald's, 2004–16; director of the Chicago Bears)
- Thomas Murphy, Chairman and CEO of General Motors Corporation (1974–80)
- Jim O'Toole (class of 1955), Major League Baseball pitcher, starter for National League in 1963 All-Star Game
- Matthew "Big Child" Keane (Class of 1988), Inventor of Flameless lunch bag.
- Stan Patrick (class of 1940), professional basketball player
- Ryan Shields (born 1983), Jamaican sprinter
- William J. Walker, Major General United States Army, commanding general, District of Columbia National Guard (class of 1975)
- Chris Watson (class of 1995), NFL defensive back (1999–2003)
