= Büşra Mutay =

Turkish track and field athlete

Personal information
- Born: 7 February 1990 (age 36) Biga, Turkey
Medal record
Representing Turkey
Balkan Athletics Indoor Championships
Silver medal – second place	2014 Istanbul	Triple jump

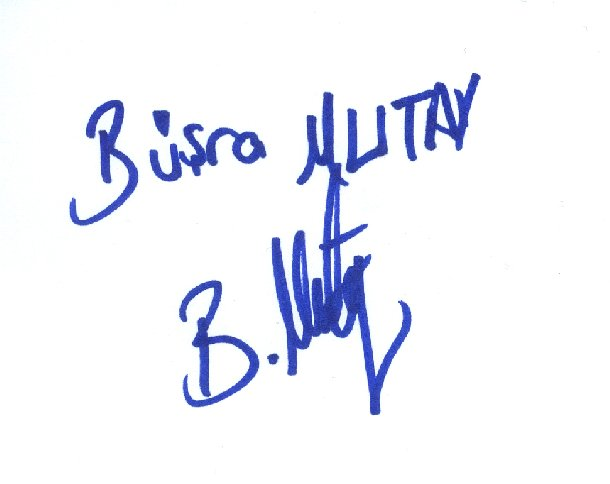
Signature of athlete

Büşra Mutay (born 7 February 1990 in Biga) is a Turkish track and field athlete competing in long jump and triple jump.

== International competitions ==
Year	Competition	Venue	Position	Event	Notes
Representing Turkey
2014	Balkan Indoor Championships	Istanbul, Turkey	4th	Long jump	6.06 m
2014	Balkan Indoor Championships	Istanbul, Turkey	2nd	Triple jump	12,92 m
2014	European Team Championships	Braunschweig, Germany	11th	Long jump	6.15 m

== Personal bests ==
Event	Best	Wind	Venue	Date
Long jump (outdoor)	6.16 m	0.2 ms (-)	İzmir, Turkey	4 June 2014
Long jump (indoor)	6.16 m	NA	Istanbul, Turkey	18 January 2015
Triple jump (outdoor)	13.04 m	0.5 ms	Ankara, Turkey	2 September 2014
Triple jump (indoor)	12.92 m	NA	Istanbul, Turkey	22 February 2014

Last updated 28 July 2015.
