= Desiree Freier =

American pole vaulter (born 1996)

Personal information
- Born: 24 July 1996 (age 29)
- Height: 5 ft 0 in (1.52 m)

Sport
- Country: USA
- Sport: Athletics
- Event: Pole vault

Achievements and titles
- Personal bests: Outdoor: 4.45 m (2014 NJR); Indoor: 4.46 m (2019)
Medal record
Women's athletics
Representing United States
World Junior Championships
Silver medal – second place	2014 Eugene	Pole vault
- Updated on 2 August 2019

Desiree Freier (born July 24, 1996) is an American track and field athlete known primarily for the pole vault. She is the current ratified junior national record holder from her 4.45 m (14 ft 7 in) set on her 18th birthday in Eugene, Oregon while taking the silver medal at the 2014 World Junior Championships. Two competitors, including her future teammate at the University of Arkansas, Lexi Weeks, have since surpassed that mark, but they have yet to be ratified.

Freier, Weeks and Week's twin sister Vicky were a powerful triple threat for Arkansas from 2015 until 2019. Freier set her personal best indoors 4.46 m (14 ft 7 1/2 in) at the 2019 NCAA Indoor Championships.

Prior to Arkansas, she competed for Northwest High School near Ft. Worth, Texas.
