= Alyona Lutkovskaya =

Russian pole vaulter (born 1995)

Alayna Lutkovskaya
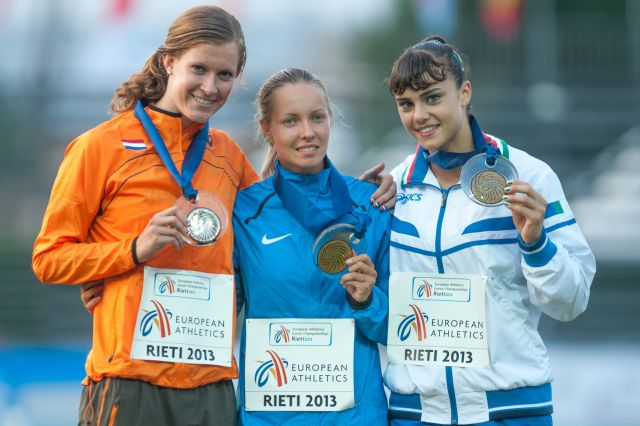
- Lutkovskaya (centre) at the 2013 European Junior Championships

Personal information
- Born: 15 March 1996 (age 30) Irkutsk, Russia

Sport
- Country: Russia
- Sport: Athletics
- Event: Pole vault

Achievements and titles
- Personal best(s): 4.61 m (2015) NU20R; Indoors; 4.54 m (2015)
Medal record
Women's athletics
Representing Russia
World Junior Championships
Gold medal – first place	2014 Eugene	Pole vault
European Junior Championships
Gold medal – first place	2013 Tallinn	Pole vault
Silver medal – second place	2015 Eskilstuna	Pole vault
World Youth Championships
Silver medal – second place	2013 Donetsk	Pole vault

Alayna Lutkovskaya (Russian: Алена Лутковская; born 15 March 1996) is a Russian pole vaulter. She won gold medals at the 2014 World Junior Championships and at the 2013 European Junior Championships. Lutkovskaya also claimed the silver medal at the 2013 World Youth Championships.

In her senior debut at the 2014 European Championships, she finished seventh.

== Career ==
In February 2014, Lutkovskaya broke the Russian junior indoor record when she jumped 4.50 m. The previous record was 4.47 m, set by Yelena Isinbayeva back in 2001. At the 2014 World Junior Championships, she jumped 4.50 m which equalled the World Junior Championships record set by Angelica Bengtsson in Barcelona in 2012. At the same time Lutkovskaya also equalled the Russian junior outdoor record set by Valeriya Volik in 2008.

In September 2014, European Athletics announced that their panel of experts had judged the Europeans who should be the nominees for the Golden Tracks awarded to the European male and female Rising Stars of the Year. Alayna Lutkovskaya was one of the nominees alongside the likes of Mariya Kuchina and Katarina Johnson-Thompson. Most well known male nominees were Adam Gemili and Wilhem Belocian. At the end it was Kuchina and Gemili who were named Rising Stars at the Golden Tracks ceremony in Baku.

In February 2015, Lutkovskaya broke her own Russian junior indoor record when she jumped 4.54 m. On 21 May, she broke World junior record when she jumped 4.61 m. The earlier record was set only one day earlier when Robeilys Peinado had jumped 4.60 m. Lutkovskaya's jump of 4.61 m was the 3rd time in 2015 season when the previous World junior outdoor record of 4.58 m set by Angelica Bengtsson in 2012 was broken because also Nina Kennedy had broken the previous record when she jumped 4.59 m in February 2015. However, Lutkovskaya's jump of 4.61 m was only World junior outdoor record because Bengtsson had jumped 4.63 m indoors and that was also officially World junior record.

Lutkovskaya has personal bests of 4.61 m (15 ft 1 1/4 in) outdoors and 4.54 m (14 ft 10 1/2 in) indoors. She was born in Irkutsk.

== Achievements ==
Representing Russia
Year	Competition	Venue	Position	Notes
2013	World Youth Championships	Donetsk, Ukraine	2nd	4.15 m
2013	European Junior Championships	Rieti, Italy	1st	4.30 m
2014	World Junior Championships	Eugene, Oregon	1st	4.50 m
2014	European Championships	Zürich, Switzerland	7th	4.35 m
2015	European Junior Championships	Eskilstuna, Sweden	2nd	4.20 m
Competing as Authorised Neutral Athletes
2019	World Championships	Doha, Qatar	27th (q)	4.35 m
