= Robeilys Peinado =

Venezuelan pole vaulter (born 1997)

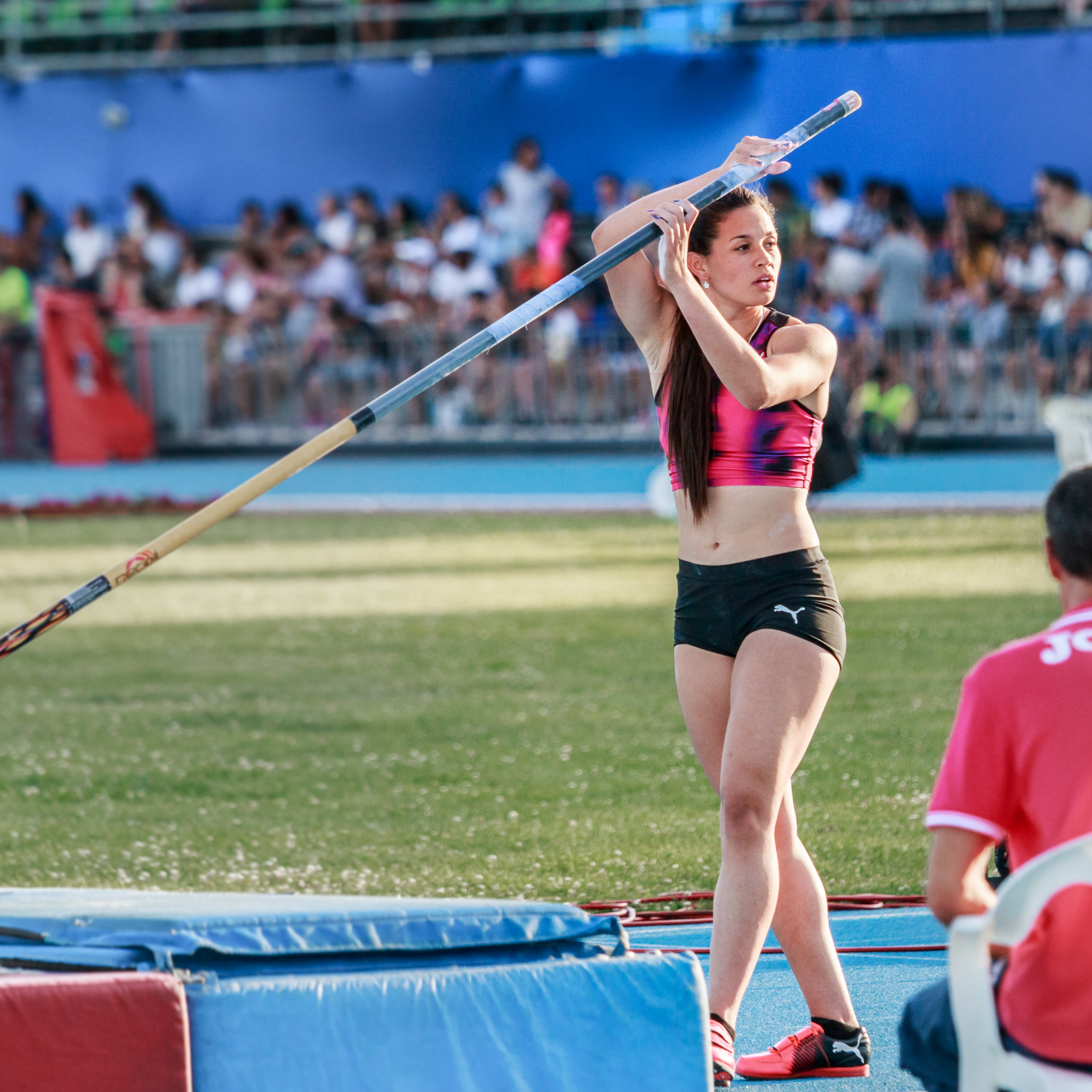
- Peinado in 2017

Personal information
- Full name: Robeilys Mariley Peinado Méndez
- Born: 26 November 1997 (age 28) Caracas, Venezuela
- Height: 1.63 m (5 ft 4 in)
- Weight: 50 kg (110 lb)

Sport
- Sport: Track and field
- Event: Pole vault
- Club: Studentesca Andrea Milardi Rieti
- Coached by: Eladio Farfan
Medal record
World Championships
Bronze medal – third place	2017 London	Pole vault
Youth Olympic Games
Silver medal – second place	2014 Nanjing	Pole vault
World Junior Championships
Silver medal – second place	2016 Bydgoszcz	Pole vault
World Youth Championships
Gold medal – first place	2013 Donetsk	Pole vault
South American Championships
Gold medal – first place	2015 Lima	Pole vault
Gold medal – first place	2017 Asunción	Pole vault
Pan American Games
Silver medal – second place	2023 Santiago	Pole vault
South American Games
Silver medal – second place	2014 Santiago	Pole vault

Robeilys Mariley Peinado Méndez (born 26 November 1997) is a Venezuelan athlete whose specialty is pole vaulting. She won the bronze medal at the 2017 World Championships in London. In addition, she won multiple medals in several age categories.

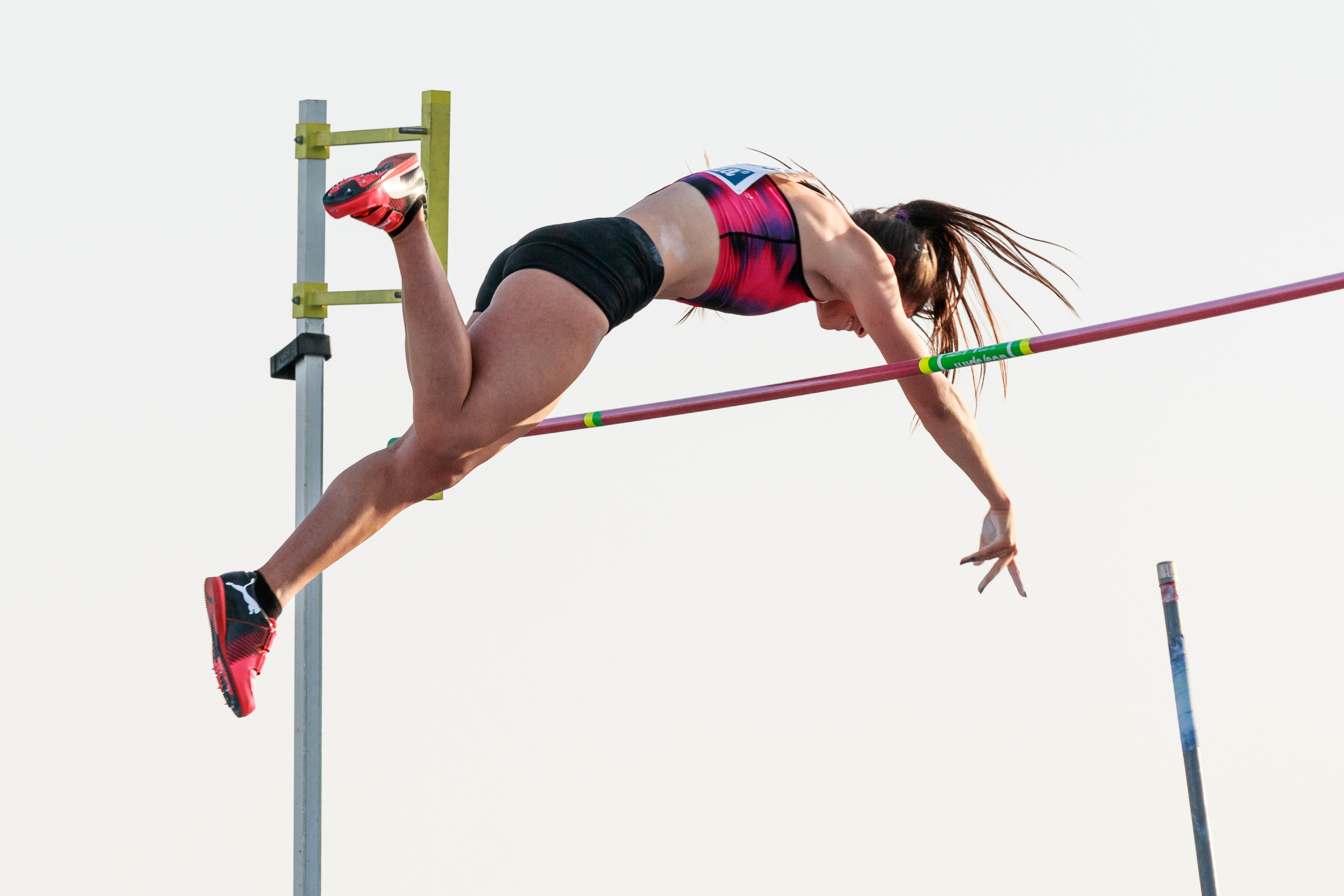
Robeilys Peinado jumping during the IAAF World Challenge Meeting Madrid 2017.

Peinado started off as a gymnast but switched to pole vault aged 12 as she was getting too tall for the sport. Her personal best in the event is 4.70 metres set in Cochabamba in 2018. This is the current national record.

== Competition record ==
Year	Competition	Venue	Position	Notes
Representing Venezuela
2013	World Youth Championships	Donetsk, Ukraine	1st	4.25 m
2013	Pan American Junior Championships	Medellín, Colombia	2nd	4.40 m
2013	Bolivarian Games	Trujillo, Peru	1st	4.30 m
2014	South American Games	Santiago, Chile	2nd	4.20 m
2014	World Junior Championships	Eugene, United States	–	NM
2014	Youth Olympic Games	Nanjing, China	2nd	4.10 m
2014	South American U23 Championships	Montevideo, Uruguay	1st	3.90 m
2014	Central American and Caribbean Games	Xalapa, Mexico	3rd	4.15 m
2014	South American Youth Championships	Cali, Colombia	1st	4.00 m
2015	South American Junior Championships	Cuenca, Ecuador	1st	4.35 m
2015	South American Championships	Lima, Peru	1st	4.35 m
2015	Pan American Games	Toronto, Canada	6th	4.40 m
2015	Pan American Junior Championships	Edmonton, Canada	1st	4.10 m
2015	World Championships	Beijing, China	23rd (q)	4.30 m
2016	World U20 Championships	Bydgoszcz, Poland	2nd	4.40 m
2017	South American Championships	Asunción, Paraguay	1st	4.50 m
2017	World Championships	London, United Kingdom	3rd	4.65 m NR
2017	Bolivarian Games	Santa Marta, Colombia	1st	4.20 m
2018	South American Games	Cochabamba, Bolivia	1st	4.70 m
2018	Central American and Caribbean Games	Barranquilla, Colombia	2nd	4.50 m
2019	South American Championships	Lima, Peru	1st	4.56 m
2019	Pan American Games	Lima, Peru	5th	4.55 m
2019	World Championships	Doha, Qatar	7th	4.70 m
2021	Olympic Games	Tokyo, Japan	8th	4.50 m
2022	South American Games	Asunción, Paraguay	1st	4.20 m
2023	ALBA Games	Caracas, Venezuela	1st	4.20 m
2023	Central American and Caribbean Games	San Salvador, El Salvador	1st	4.60 m
2023	South American Championships	São Paulo, Brazil	2nd	4.50 m
2023	World Championships	Budapest, Hungary	8th	4.65 m
2023	Pan American Games	Santiago, Chile	2nd	4.55 m
2024	Ibero-American Championships	Cuiabá, Brazil	1st	4.50 m
2024	Olympic Games	Paris, France	10th	4.60 m
