= Elienor Werner =

Swedish pole vaulter

Personal information
- Born: 17 August 1998 (age 27)

Sport
- Country: Sweden
- Sport: Athletics
- Event: Pole vault

Achievements and titles
- Personal best: Pole vault: 4.35 m (2016)

Elienor Werner (born 5 May 1998) is a Swedish female Pole vaulter, who won an individual gold medal at the Youth World Championships.
